= Bisexuality in the United States =

The bisexual pride flag

Bisexuality has a long history in the United States, dating back to the early 20th century. The US have played a pivotal role in both the bisexual theory and the organization of the bisexual movement.

== Early history ==
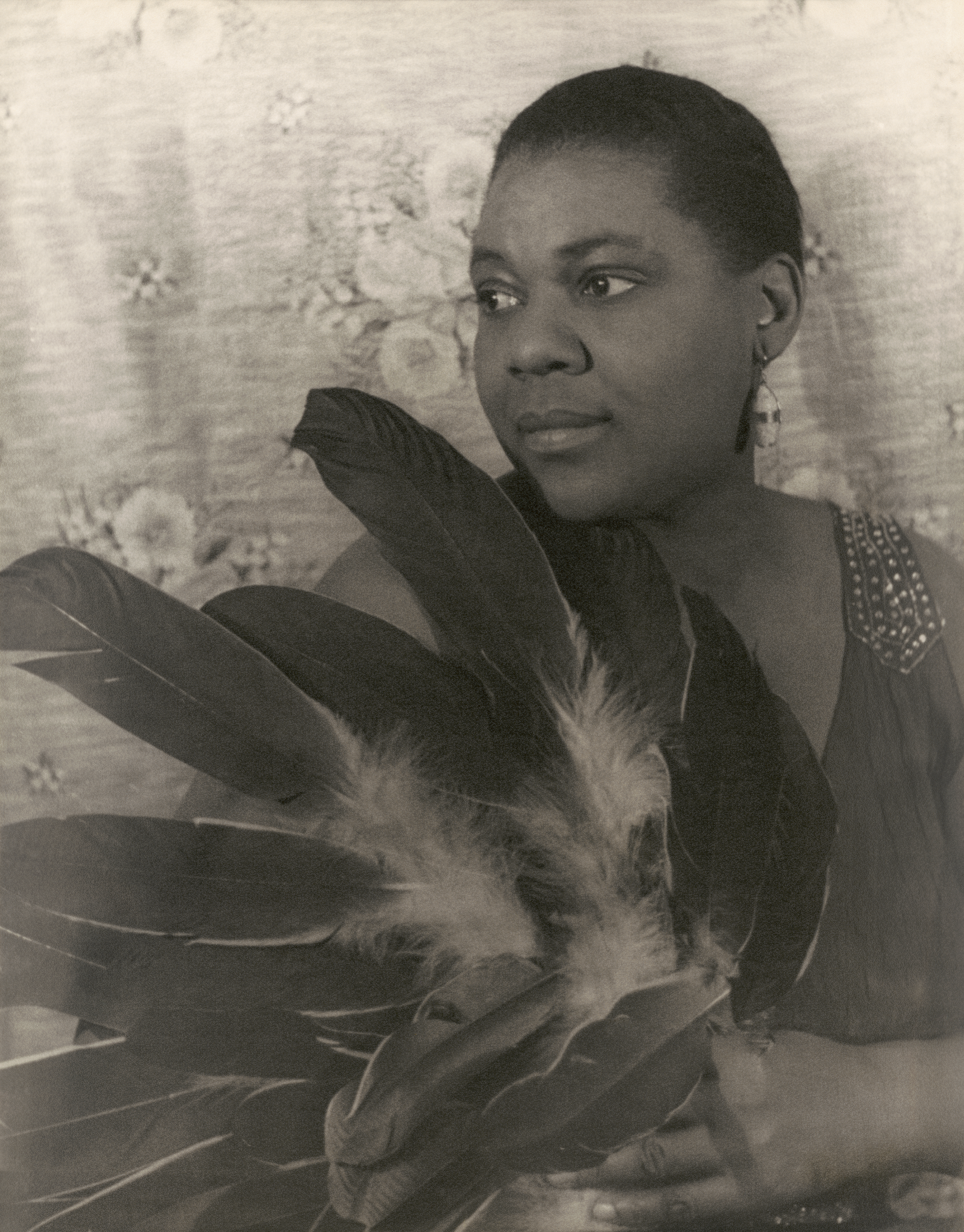
Blues singer Bessie Smith had relationships with both men and women (photo by Carl Van Vechten).

The first English-language use of the word "bisexual" referring to sexual orientation was by the American neurologist Charles Gilbert Chaddock in his 1892 translation of the 7th edition of Krafft-Ebing's seminal work Psychopathia Sexualis. Prior to this, "bisexual" typically referred to reproductive hermaphrodites, especially in botany. Under any label, openly bisexual people were rare in early American life. One notable exception was the openly bisexual poet Edna St. Vincent Millay, who received the Pulitzer Prize for Poetry for The Ballad of the Harp-Weaver in 1923. The 19th century poet Walt Whitman is usually described by biographers as either bisexual or homosexual in his feelings and attractions. In the early 20th century, during the Harlem Renaissance, blues singers Ma Rainey and Bessie Smith made no secret about their relationships with both men and women and songs like "Sissy Man Blues", "Freakish Blues" and Rainey's "Prove It on Me" spoke openly of homosexual and bisexual relationships.

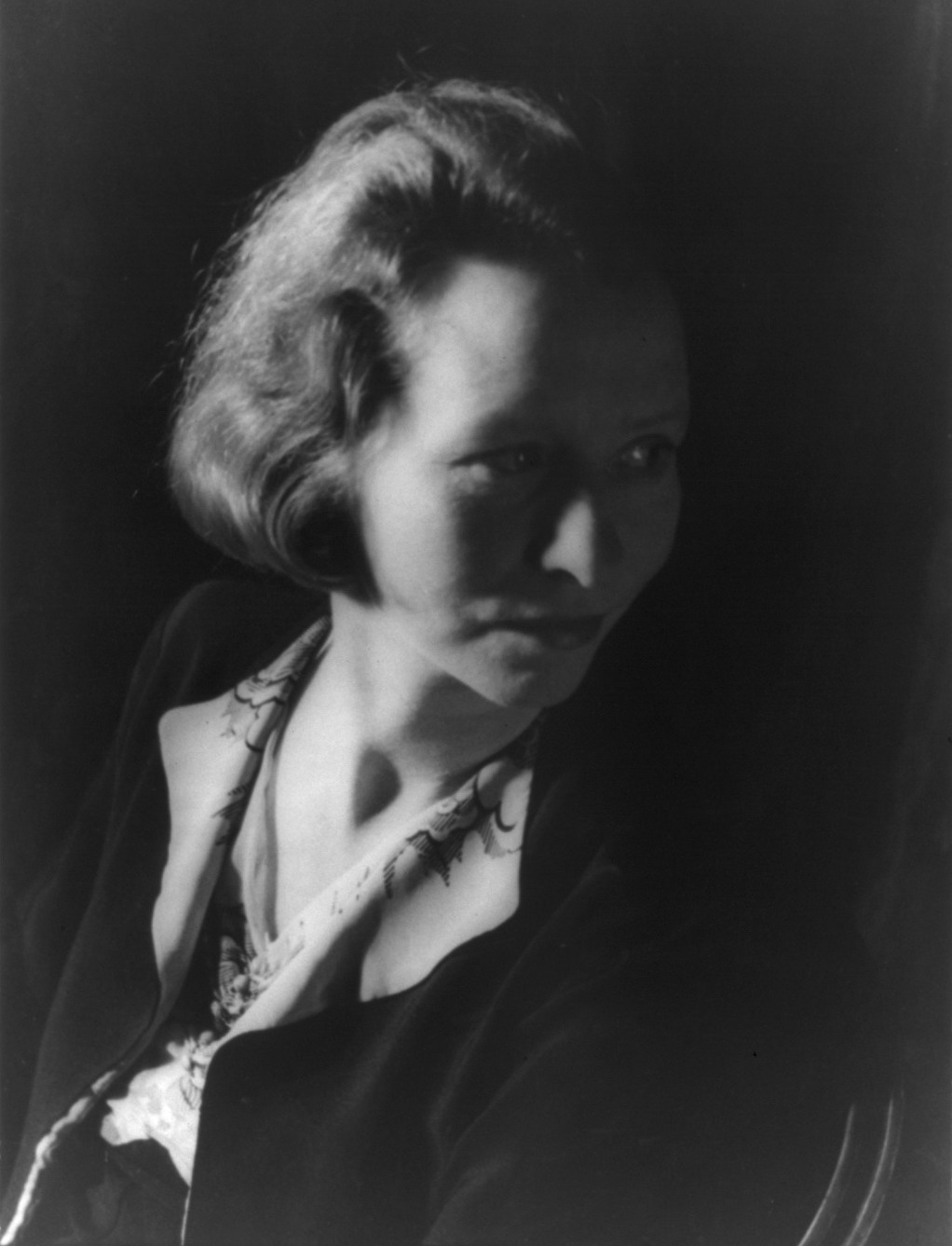
Poet Edna St. Vincent Millay was openly bisexual.

Early film, being a cutting-edge medium, also provided opportunity for bisexuality to be expressed. In 1914 the first documented appearance of bisexual characters (female and male) in an American motion picture occurred in A Florida Enchantment, by Sidney Drew. However, due to the censorship legally required by the Hays Code, the word bisexual could not be mentioned and almost no bisexual characters appeared in American film from 1934 until 1968.

Bisexual Americans were given some visibility in the research of Alfred Kinsey (who was himself bisexual) and his colleagues in the late 1940s and early 1950s; they found that 28% of women and 46% of men had responded erotically to or were sexually active with both women and men.

Their research also found that 11.6% of white males (ages 20–35) had about equal heterosexual and homosexual experience/response throughout their adult lives, and that 7% of single females (ages 20–35) and 4% of previously married females (ages 20–35) had about equal heterosexual and homosexual experience/response for this period of their lives. As a result of this research, the earlier meanings of the word "bisexual" were largely displaced by the meaning of being attracted to both women and men. However, Kinsey himself disliked the use of the term bisexual to describe individuals engaging in sexual activity regardless of gender, preferring to use "bisexual" in its older, biological sense of reproductive hermaphrodites, saying, "Until it is demonstrated [that] taste in a sexual relation is dependent upon the individual containing within his [sic] anatomy both male and female structures, or male and female physiological capacities, it is unfortunate to call such individuals bisexual" (Kinsey et al., 1948, p. 657).

== Late 20th century ==
=== 1960s ===
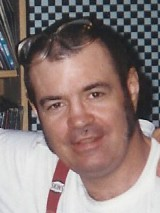
Bisexual activist Stephen Donaldson, aka Donny the Punk, founded Student Homophile Leagues at Columbia and New York University in 1966.

LGBT political activism became more prominent in the 1960s. The first public protests for equal rights for gay and lesbian people were staged at governmental offices and historic landmarks in New York, Philadelphia, and Washington, D.C., between 1965 and 1969. In D.C., protesters picketed in front of the White House, Pentagon, and the U.S. Civil Service Commission. One woman at the second White House picket of those protests, J.D., identified herself as a bisexual.

In 1966, bisexual activist Robert A. Martin (aka Donny the Punk) founded the Student Homophile League at Columbia University and New York University. In 1967 Columbia University officially recognized this group, thus making them the first college in the United States to officially recognize a gay student group. Activism on behalf of bisexuals in particular also began to grow, especially in San Francisco. One of the earliest organizations for bisexuals, the Sexual Freedom League in San Francisco, was facilitated by Margo Rila and Frank Esposito beginning in 1967. Two years later, during a staff meeting at a San Francisco mental health facility serving LGBT people, nurse Maggi Rubenstein came out as bisexual. Due to this, bisexuals began to be included in the facility's programs for the first time.

The Stonewall Rebellion, considered the beginning of the modern LGBT rights movement, occurred at the Stonewall bar in 1969. Bar patrons, including bisexuals, stood up to the police during a raid. In commemoration of this, the next year the first LGBT pride march was held. Bisexual activist Brenda Howard is known as the "Mother of Pride", for her work in coordinating the first LGBT Pride march, and she also originated the idea for a week-long series of events around Pride Day which became the genesis of the annual LGBT Pride celebrations that are now held around the world every June. Additionally, Howard along with the bisexual activist Robert A. Martin (aka Donny the Punk) and gay activist L. Craig Schoonmaker are credited with popularizing the word "Pride" to describe these festivities. Bisexual activist Tom Limoncelli later stated, "The next time someone asks you why LGBT Pride marches exist or why [LGBT] Pride Month is June tell them 'A bisexual woman named Brenda Howard thought it should be.'"

=== 1970s ===
Bisexuals became more prominent in the media in the 1970s. In 1972 bisexual activist Don Fass founded the National Bisexual Liberation group in New York City, which issued The Bisexual Expression, most likely the earliest bisexual newsletter. In 1973 bisexual activist Woody Glenn was interviewed by a radio show of the National Organization for Women on WICC in Bridgeport, Connecticut. In 1974, both Newsweek and Time magazines ran stories on "bisexual chic", bringing bisexuality to mainstream attention as never before. In 1976 the landmark book View from Another Closet: Exploring Bisexuality in Women, by Janet Mode, was published.

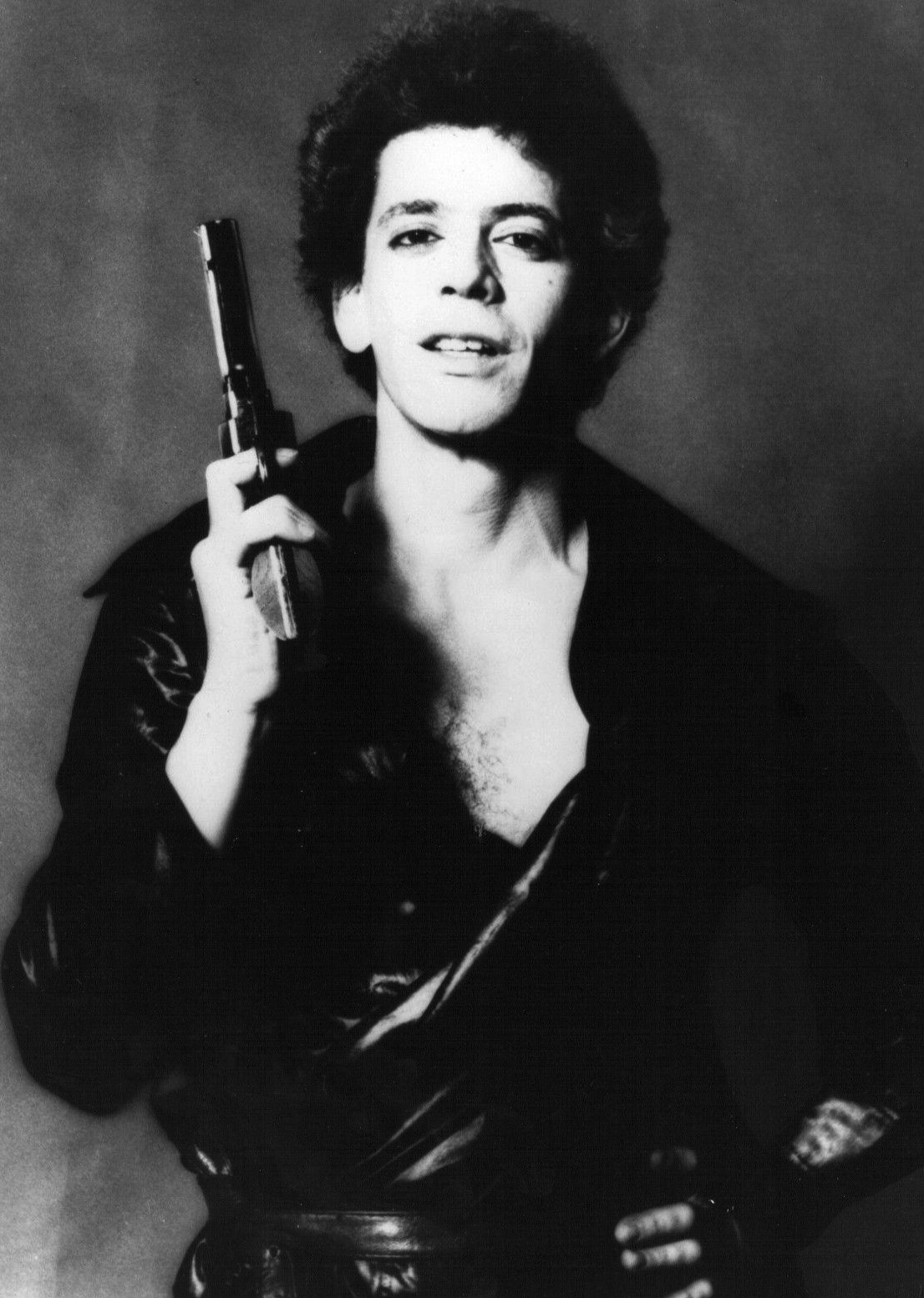
Lou Reed was a bisexual 1970s icon.

Bisexuals were also important contributors to the larger LGBT rights movement. In 1972, Bill Beasley, a bisexual activist in the civil rights movement as well as the LGBT movement, was the core organizer of the first Los Angeles Gay Pride March. He was also active with the Gay Liberation Front. In 1975, activist Carol Queen came out as bisexual and organized GAYouth in Eugene, Oregon. In 1977 Alan Rockway, a psychologist and bisexual activist, co-authored America's first successful gay rights ordinance put to public vote, in Dade County, Florida. Anita Bryant campaigned against the ordinance, and Rockway began a boycott of Florida orange juice, which she advertised, in response. The San Francisco Bisexual Center also helped sponsor a press conference with lesbian activists Del Martin and Phyllis Lyon, and pediatrician Dr. Benjamin Spock, in opposition to Bryant. The Florida Citrus Commission canceled her contract as a direct response to this pressure. In 1979, Dr. Marvin Colter and John Soroczak co-founded Arete, The Bisexual Center of Southern California, in Whittier, California, a support and social group for bisexuals, which marched in the 1982 Los Angeles Gay pride. John Soroczak, a psychotherapist, facilitated the first bisexual rap group at the Los Angeles Gay and Lesbian Center in 1994. Also in 1979 A. Billy S. Jones, a bisexual founding member of the National Coalition of Black Lesbians and Gays, helped organize the first black gay delegation to meet with President Jimmy Carter's White House staff. Jones was also a core organizer of the 1979 National March on Washington for Lesbian and Gay Rights, and "Third world conference: When will the ignorance end?", the first national conference for gay and lesbian people of color.

The bisexual movement had its own successes as well. Most notably, in 1972 a Quaker group, the Committee of Friends on Bisexuality, issued the "Ithaca Statement on Bisexuality" supporting bisexuals. The Statement, which may have been "the first public declaration of the bisexual movement" and "was certainly the first statement on bisexuality issued by an American religious assembly", appeared in the Quaker Friends Journal and The Advocate in 1972.

In 1976, Harriet Levi and Maggi Rubenstein founded the San Francisco Bisexual Center. It was the longest surviving bisexual community center, offering counseling and support services to Bay Area bisexuals, as well as publishing a newsletter, The Bi Monthly, from 1976 to 1984. In 1978, bisexual activist Dr. Fritz Klein introduced the Klein Sexual Orientation Grid in his book The Bisexual Option: A Concept of One-Hundred Percent Intimacy, in which he examined the incidence and nature of bisexuality, the attitudes of bisexual persons, and the rewards of bisexuality. Bisexual activism also began to spread beyond the coasts, as from 1978 until 1979, several Midwestern bisexual groups were created, such as One To Five (founded by Scott Bartell and Gary Lingen for Minneapolis/St.Paul, Minn), BI Women Welcome in Minneapolis, The BI Married Men's Group in the Detroit suburbs, and BI Ways in Chicago.

=== 1980s ===
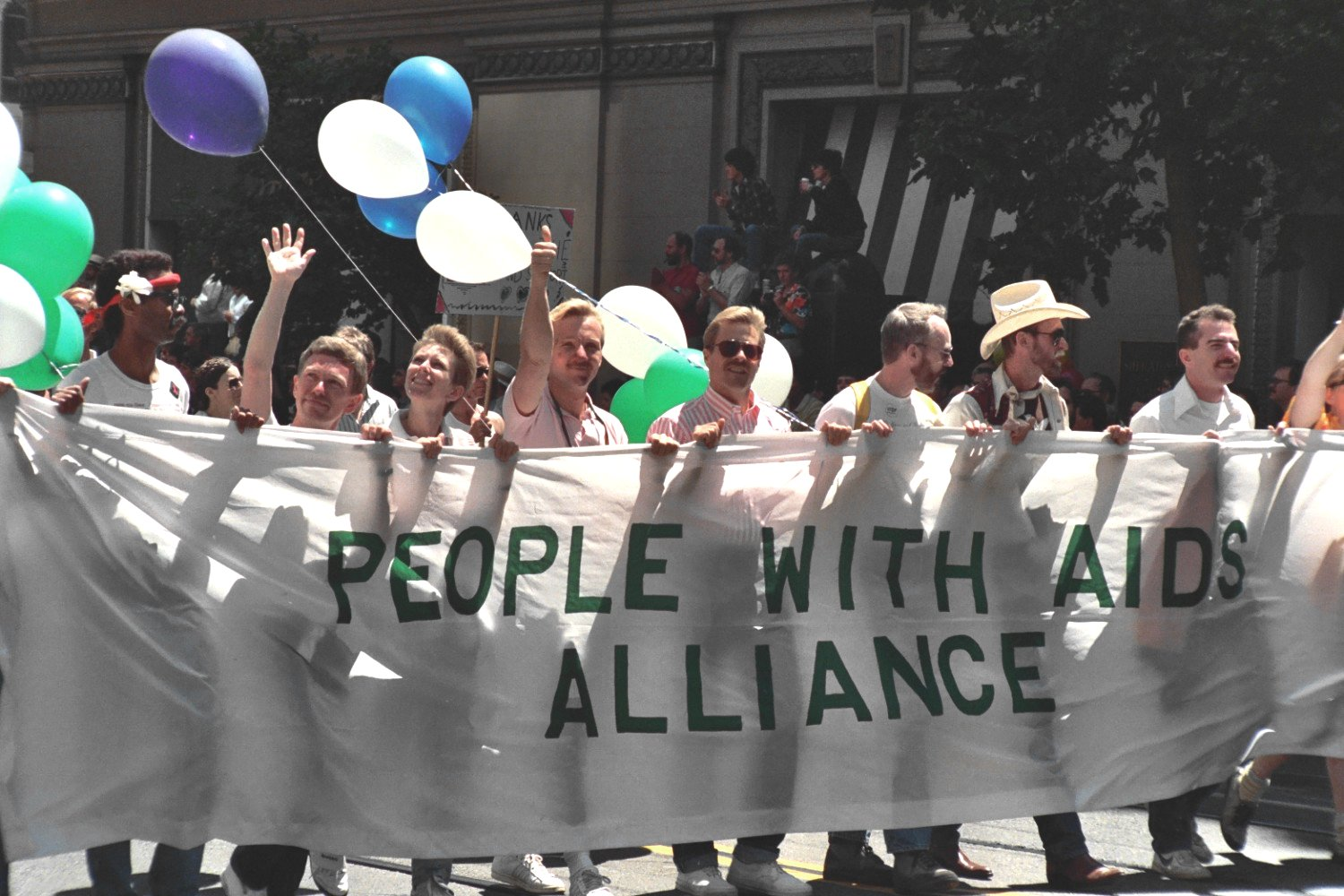
San Francisco Pride 1986

In the 1980s AIDS began to affect the LGBT community, and bisexual people took an important role in combating it. In 1981 bisexual activists David Lourea and Cynthia Slater presented safer-sex education in bathhouses and BDSM clubs in San Francisco. In 1984, David Lourea finally persuaded the San Francisco Department of Public Health to recognize bisexual men in their official AIDS statistics (the weekly "New AIDS cases and mortality statistics" report), after two years of campaigning. Health departments throughout the United States began to recognize bisexual men because of this, whereas before they had mostly only recognized gay men. Bisexual activists also fought for the recognition of women in the AIDS epidemic. From 1984 until 1986, bisexual activist Veneita Porter, of the Prostitute's Union of Massachusetts and COYOTE (Call Off Your Old Tired Ethics), advocated for women, transgender people, and injection drug users with AIDS. In 1985, Cynthia Slater, who was HIV-positive, organized the first Women's HIV/AIDS Information Switchboard. This sort of activism was particularly important for bisexuals as they were often blamed for spreading AIDS to their heterosexual partners. For example, in 1987, Newsweek portrayed bisexual men as "the ultimate pariahs" of the AIDS epidemic, and bisexual activist and person with AIDS Alan Rockway of BiPOL was quoted speaking against the stereotype. An October 1989 Cosmopolitan magazine article that stereotyped bisexual men as dishonest spreaders of AIDS led to a letter-writing campaign by the New York Area Bisexual Network (NYABN). Cosmopolitan has printed no articles defaming bisexuals since the campaign.

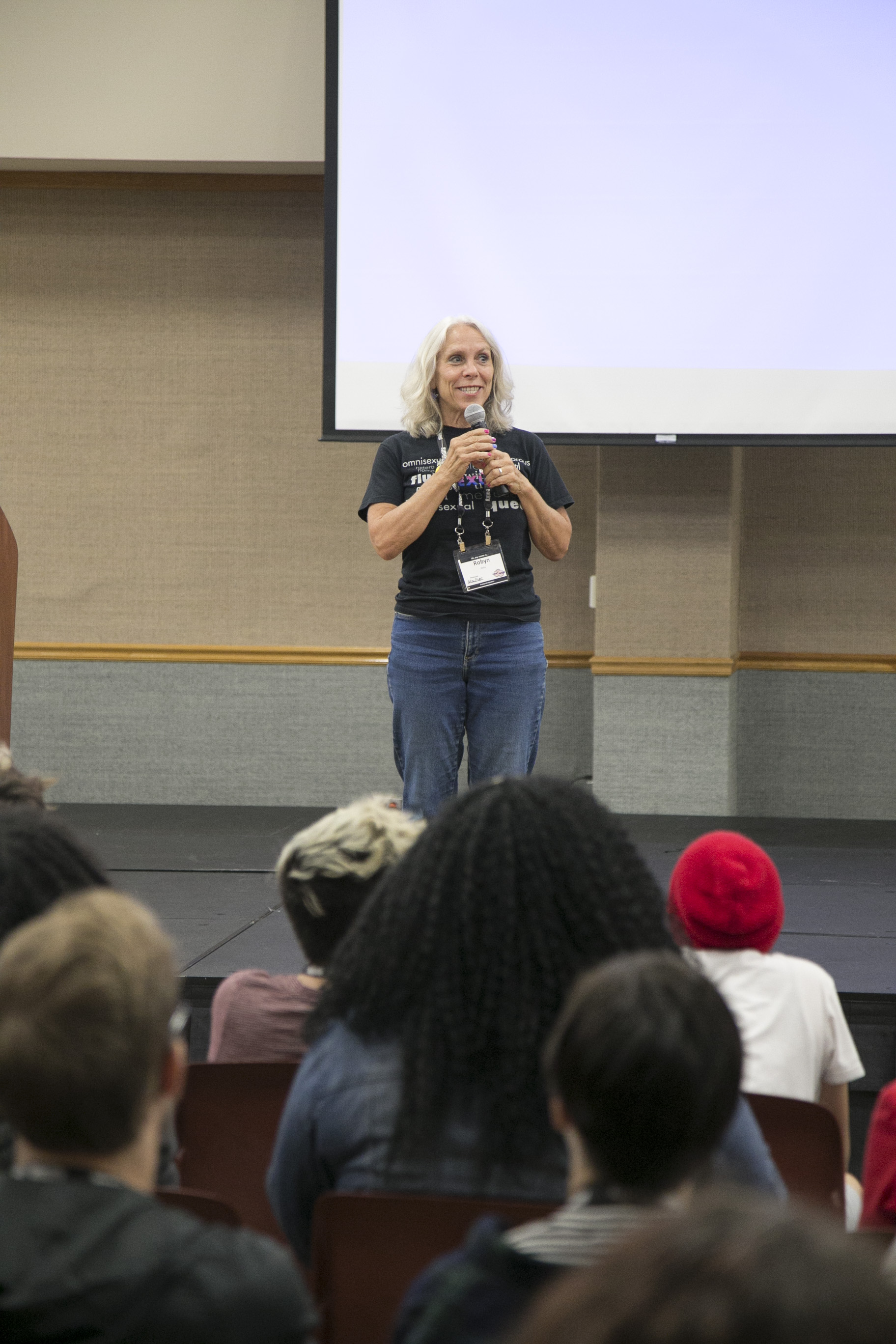
Robyn Ochs helped establish the bisexual history archives in 1987.

The bisexual movement enjoyed some important firsts during the 1980s. The Boston Bisexual Women's Network, the oldest existing bisexual women's group, was founded in 1983 and began publishing their bi-monthly newsletter, BI Women. It is the longest-existing bisexual newsletter in the US. Also in 1983, BiPOL, the first and oldest bisexual political organization, was founded in San Francisco by bisexual activists Autumn Courtney, Lani Ka'ahumanu, Arlene Krantz, David Lourea, Bill Mack, Alan Rockway, and Maggi Rubenstein. In 1984, BiPOL sponsored the first bisexual rights rally, outside the Democratic National Convention in San Francisco. The rally featured nine speakers from civil rights groups allied with the bisexual movement. Also in 1984, the First East Coast Conference on Bisexuality (which was also the first regional bisexual conference in the US) was held at the Storrs School of Social Work at the University of Connecticut, with about 150 people participating. Participants in the conference then founded the East Coast Bisexual Network in 1985, which later was renamed the Bisexual Resource Center (BRC) in 1993. In 1987, the East Coast Bisexual Network established the first Bisexual History Archives with bisexual activist Robyn Ochs' initial collection; archivist Clare Morton hosted researchers. Also in 1987, the Bay Area Bisexual Network, the oldest and largest bisexual group in the San Francisco Bay Area, was founded by Lani Ka'ahumanu, Ann Justi and Maggi Rubenstein.

In 1988, Gary North published the first national bisexual newsletter, called Bisexuality: News, Views, and Networking. In 1989 Cliff Arnesen testified before the U.S. Congress on behalf of bisexual, lesbian, and gay veteran's issues. He was the first veteran to testify about bisexual, lesbian, and gay issues and the first openly non-heterosexual veteran to testify on Capitol Hill about veteran's issues in general. He testified on May 3, 1989, during formal hearings held before the U.S. House Committee on Veterans Affairs: Subcommittee on Oversight and Investigations. He also testified before the same Subcommittee on May 16, 1990, as part of an HIV/AIDS panel.

Bisexual people also continued to be active in the larger LGBT movement. In 1986 BiPOL's Autumn Courtney was elected co-chair of San Francisco's Lesbian Gay Freedom Day Pride Parade Committee; she was the first openly bisexual person to hold this sort of position in the United States. In 1987 a group of 75 bisexuals marched in the Second National March on Washington for Lesbian and Gay Rights, which was the first nationwide bisexual gathering. The article "The Bisexual Movement: Are We Visible Yet?", by Lani Ka'ahumanu, appeared in the official Civil Disobedience Handbook for the March. It was the first article about bisexuals and the emerging bisexual movement to be published in a national lesbian or gay publication. The North American Bisexual Network, the first national bisexual organization, was first thought of at this gathering, though not founded until three years later (see below.) NABN would later change its name to BiNet USA.

The biangles symbol of bisexuality, designed by artist Liz Nania

Another important development is that the biangles symbol of bisexuality was designed by artist Liz Nania as she co-organized a bisexual contingent for the Second National March on Washington for Lesbian and Gay Rights in 1987. The design of the biangles began with the pink triangle, a Nazi concentration camp badge that later became a symbol of gay liberation representing homosexuality. The addition of a blue triangle contrasts the pink and represents heterosexuality. The two triangles overlap and form lavender, which represents the "queerness of bisexuality", referencing the Lavender Menace and 1980s and 1990s associations of lavender with queerness.

The double crescent moon bisexuality symbol, designed by Vivian Wagner

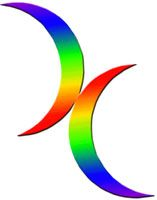
A version of the double crescent moon bisexuality symbol with rainbow flag colors

(Some bisexual individuals object to the use of a pink triangle in the biangles symbol of bisexuality (see above), as it was a symbol that Adolf Hitler's regime used to tag and persecute homosexuals. In response, a double crescent moon symbol of bisexuality was devised by Vivian Wagner in 1998. This symbol is common in Germany and surrounding countries.)

Also in 1987, Barney Frank became the first U.S. congressman to come out as gay of his own volition; he was inspired in part by the death of Stewart McKinney, a closeted bisexual Republican representative from Connecticut. Frank told The Washington Post that after McKinney's death there was, "An unfortunate debate about 'Was he or wasn't he? Didn't he or did he?' I said to myself, I don't want that to happen to me."

=== 1990s ===
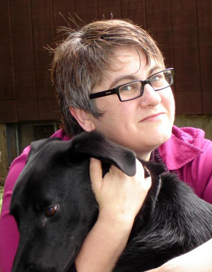
Wendy Curry, one of the organizers of the first Celebrate Bisexuality Day in 1999

The oldest national bisexuality organization in the United States, BiNet USA, was founded in 1990. It was originally called the North American Multicultural Bisexual Network (NAMBN), and had its first meeting at the first National Bisexual Conference in America. This first conference was held in San Francisco, and sponsored by BiPOL. Bisexual health was one of eight workshop tracks at the conference, and the "NAMES Project" quilt was displayed with bisexual quilt pieces. Over 450 people attended from 20 states and 5 countries, and the mayor of San Francisco sent a proclamation "commending the bisexual rights community for its leadership in the cause of social justice", and declaring June 23, 1990, Bisexual Pride Day. The conference also inspired attendees from Dallas to create the first bisexual group in Texas, called BiNet Dallas.

The bisexual movement also became more accepted as part of established institutions. In 1990, Susan Carlton offered the first academic course on bisexuality in America at UC Berkeley, and in 1991, psychologists Sari Dworkin and Ron Fox became the founding co-chairs of the Task Force on Bisexual Issues of Division 44, the gay and lesbian group in the American Psychological Association. In 1997, bisexual activist and psychologist Pat Ashbrook pioneered a national model for LGBT support groups within the Veterans Administration hospital system.

Bisexual literature became more prominent in the 1990s. In 1991, the Bay Area Bisexual Network began publishing the first national bisexual quarterly magazine, Anything That Moves: Beyond the Myths of Bisexuality, founded by Karla Rossi, who was the managing editor of the editorial collective until 1993. 1991 also saw the publication of one of the seminal books in the history of the modern bisexual rights movement, Bi Any Other Name: Bisexual People Speak Out, an anthology edited by Loraine Hutchins and Lani Ka'ahumanu. After this anthology was forced to compete (and lost) in the Lambda Literary Awards under the category Lesbian Anthology, and in 2005, Directed by Desire: Collected Poems a posthumous collection of the bisexual Jamaican American writer June Jordan's work had to compete (and won) in the category "Lesbian Poetry", BiNet USA led the bisexual community in a multi-year campaign eventually resulting in the addition of a Bisexual category, starting with the 2006 Awards. In 1995, Harvard Shakespeare professor Marjorie Garber made the academic case for bisexuality with her book Vice Versa: Bisexuality and the Eroticism of Everyday Life, in which she argued that most people would be bisexual if not for "repression, religion, repugnance, denial, laziness, shyness, lack of opportunity, premature specialization, a failure of imagination, or a life already full to the brim with erotic experiences, albeit with only one person, or only one gender". In 1997, bisexual activist Dr. Fritz Klein founded the Journal of Bisexuality, the first academic, quarterly journal on bisexuality. However, other media proved more mixed in terms of representing bisexuals. In 1990, a film with a relationship between two bisexual women, called Henry and June, became the first film to receive the NC-17 rating from the Motion Picture Association of America (MPAA). But in 1993, bisexual activist Sheela Lambert wrote, produced, and hosted the first television series by and for bisexuals, called Bisexual Network. It aired for 13 weeks on NYC Public Access Cable.

Regional organizations in the bisexual movement also began to have more impact. In 1992 the Bisexual Connection (Minnesota) sponsored the First Annual Midwest Regional Bisexual Conference, called BECAUSE (Bisexual Empowerment Conference: A Uniting, Supportive Experience). That year Minnesota changed its State Civil Rights Law to grant the most comprehensive civil rights protections for bisexual, lesbian, gay, and transgender people in the country. Minnesota's bisexual community had united with lesbian, gay, and transgender groups to lobby for this statute. Also in 1992, the South Florida Bisexual Network (founded in 1989) and the Florida International University's Stonewall Students Union co-sponsored the First Annual Southeast Regional Bisexual Conference. Thirty-five people from at least four southeastern states attended. In 1993 the First Annual Northwest Regional Conference was sponsored by BiNet USA, the Seattle Bisexual Women's Network, and the Seattle Bisexual Men's Union. It was held in Seattle, and fifty-five people representing Washington, Oregon, Alaska, Montana, and British Columbia attended.

An important event in the LGBT rights movement in this decade was the 1993 March on Washington for Lesbian, Gay and Bi Equal Rights and Liberation. As a result of lobbying by BiPOL (San Francisco), openly bisexual people held key leadership roles in local and regional organizing for the March, and for the first time bisexuals were included in the title of the March. Also, openly bisexual activist and author Lani Ka'ahumanu spoke at the rally, and over 1,000 people marched with the bisexual group. Coinciding with the March, BiNet USA, the Bisexual Resource Center (BRC), and the Washington, DC–based Alliance of Multicultural Bisexuals (AMBi) sponsored the Second National Conference Celebrating Bisexuality in Washington, DC. Over than 600 people attended from the US and Europe, making it at the time the largest Bisexual Conference ever held.

Another important event in the LGBT rights movement was the enactment of the "Don't Ask Don't Tell" policy. Before the "Don't Ask Don't Tell" policy was enacted in 1993, bisexuals (and lesbians and gays) were banned from serving in the military. In 1993 the "Don't Ask Don't Tell" policy was enacted, which mandated that the military could not ask servicemembers about their sexual orientation. However, until the policy was ended in 2011 service members were still expelled from the military if they engaged in sexual conduct with a member of the same sex, stated that they were bisexual, gay, or lesbian, and/or married or attempted to marry someone of the same sex.

Several important surveys concerning bisexuality were conducted around this time. In 1993, Ron Fox authored the first large scale research study on bisexual identity, and established and maintained a comprehensive bibliography on bi research. Also in 1993, The Janus Report on Sexual Behavior showed that five percent of men and three percent of women considered themselves bisexual. In 1995 BiNet USA Bisexual Youth Initiative, Fayetteville, North Carolina, developed and mailed a national survey to LGBT youth programs. The survey was published and sent back to agencies, offering assistance to improve services to bisexual youth.

In 1992, Colorado voters approved by initiative an amendment to the Colorado state constitution (Amendment 2) that would have prevented any city, town, or county in the state from taking any legislative, executive, or judicial action to recognize bisexuals or gay people as a protected class. The amendment stated:

Neither the State of Colorado, through any of its branches or departments, nor any of its agencies, political subdivisions, municipalities or school districts, shall enact, adopt or enforce any statute, regulation, ordinance or policy whereby homosexual, lesbian or bisexual orientation, conduct, practices or relationships shall constitute or otherwise be the basis of or entitle any person or class of persons to have or claim any minority status, quota preferences, protected status or claim of discrimination. This Section of the Constitution shall be in all respects self-executing.

This led to the 1996 Supreme Court Case Romer v. Evans, in which the Court ruled in a 6–3 decision that the state constitutional amendment in Colorado preventing protected status based upon bisexuality or homosexuality did not satisfy the Equal Protection Clause. The majority opinion in Romer stated that the amendment lacked "a rational relationship to legitimate state interests", and the dissent stated that the majority "evidently agrees that 'rational basis'—the normal test for compliance with the Equal Protection Clause—is the governing standard". The state constitutional amendment failed rational basis review.

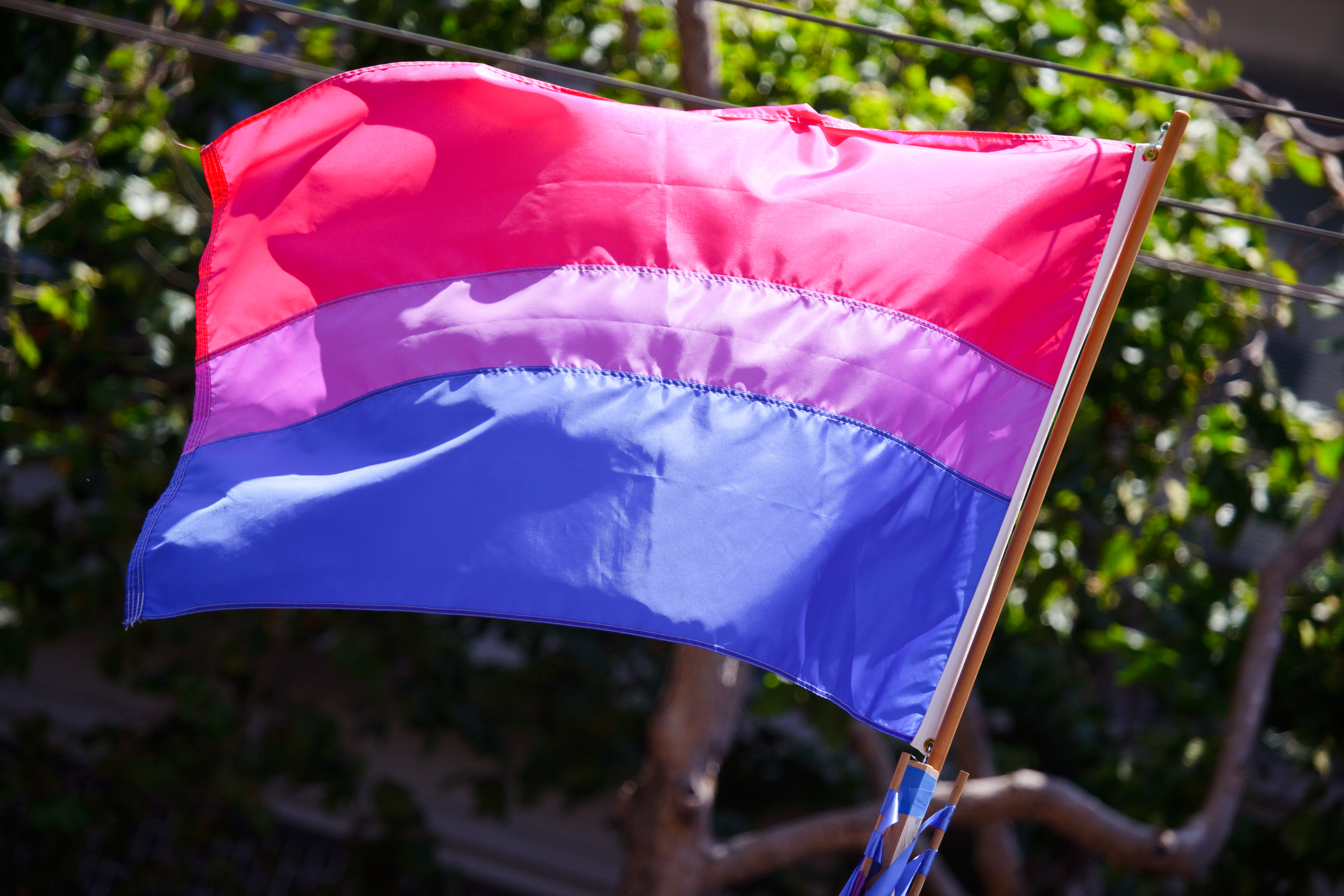
A physical version of the bisexual pride flag.

The concept of bisexual pride became more widespread in the late 1990s. At an LGBT PrideFest in Connecticut in 1997, Evelyn Mantilla came out as America's first openly bisexual state official. The bisexual pride flag designed by Michael Page was unveiled December 5, 1998. The first Celebrate Bisexuality Day was organized by Michael Page, Gigi Raven Wilbur, and Wendy Curry in 1999, and is now observed annually on September 23.

== 21st century ==
=== 2000s ===
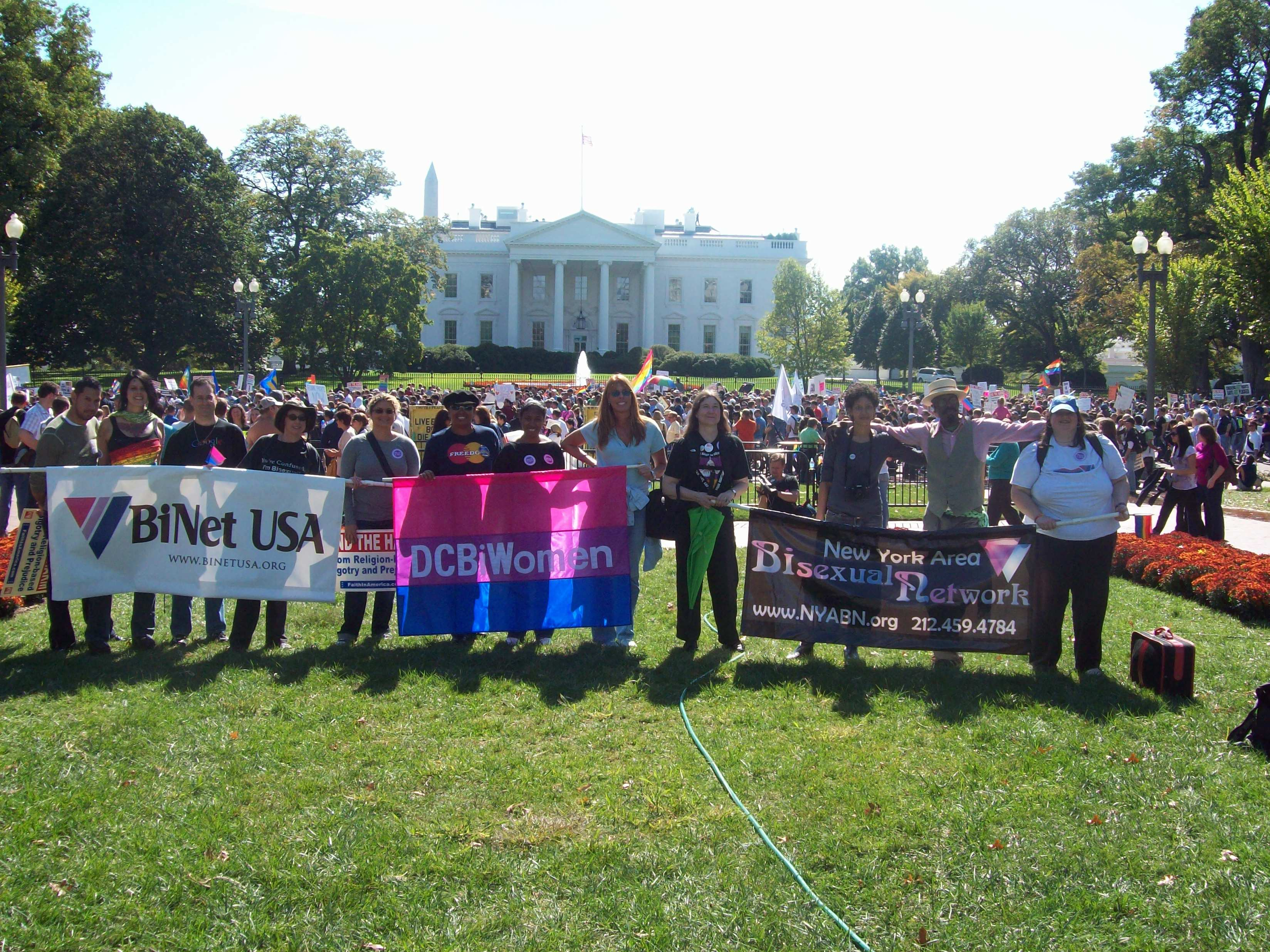
Bisexual activists in 2009

Bisexual people had notable accomplishments in the LGBT rights movement at this time. In 2001, the American Psychological Association (APA)'s "Guidelines on psychotherapy with lesbian, gay and bisexual clients" stated "homosexuality and bisexuality are not a mental illness"; bisexual activist Ron Fox served on the task force that produced the guidelines. In 2002, Pete Chvany, Luigi Ferrer, James Green, Loraine Hutchins and Monica McLemore presented at the Gay, Lesbian, Bisexual, Transgender, Queer and Intersex Health Summit, held in Boulder, Colorado, marking the first time bisexual people, transgender people, and intersex people were recognized as co-equal partners on the national level rather than gay and lesbian "allies" or tokens. Also in 2002, bisexual activist Robyn Ochs delivered the first bi-focused keynote during the National Association of Lesbian and Gay Addiction Professionals. In 2003, the Union for Reform Judaism retroactively applied its pro-rights policy on gays and lesbians to both the bisexual and transgender communities. In 2005, bisexual scholars and activists mobilized with The Task Force, GLAAD and BiNet USA to meet with New York Times science section editor and researcher Brian Dodge to respond to misinformation the paper had published on a study about bisexual men. The study, entitled Sexual Arousal Patterns of Bisexual Men, by the controversial researcher J. Michael Bailey, allegedly "proved" that bisexual men did not exist. With little critical examination, various media celebrities and outlets jumped on the band-wagon and claimed to have "solved" the "problem of bisexuality" by declaring it to be non-existent, at least in men. Further studies, including improved follow-up research led by Michael Bailey, proved this to be false. Also in 2005, the Queens Chapter of PFLAG announced the creation of the "Brenda Howard Memorial Award", marking the first time a major American LGBT organization named an award after an openly bisexual person. The National Equality March in Washington, D.C., was held on October 11, 2009, calling for equal protection for bisexual, lesbian, gay, and transgender people in all matters governed by civil law in all states and districts; a dedicated bisexual, pansexual, and queer-identified contingent was organized as part of the March. Several bisexual groups came together and marched, including BiNet USA, New York Area Bisexual Network, DC Bi Women and BiMA DC. There were also four out bisexual speakers at the National Equality March rally: Michael Huffington, Lady Gaga, Chloe Noble, and Penelope Williams. In October 2009, LGBT activist Amy Andre was appointed as executive director of the San Francisco Pride Celebration Committee, making her the organization's first openly bisexual woman of color executive director.

Significant reports about bisexuals were also released in this decade. In 2002, a survey in the United States by National Center for Health Statistics found that 1.8 percent of men ages 18–44 considered themselves bisexual, 2.3 percent homosexual, and 3.9 percent as "something else". The same study found that 2.8 percent of women ages 18–44 considered themselves bisexual, 1.3 percent homosexual, and 3.8 percent as "something else". A 2007 report said that 14.4% of young US women identified themselves as bisexual/lesbian, with 5.6% of the men identifying as gay or bisexual. Also in 2007, an article in the 'Health' section of The New York Times stated that "1.5 percent of American women and 1.7 percent of American men identify themselves [as] bisexual."

In 2008 Kate Brown was elected as the Oregon Secretary of State, becoming America's first openly bisexual statewide officeholder.

=== 2010s ===
In 2011, one of the demands of 2009's National Equality March was met as the "Don't Ask Don't Tell" policy was ended, allowing bisexuals, lesbians, and gay men in the U.S. military to be open about their sexuality.

San Francisco's Human Rights Commission released a report on bisexual visibility in 2011, marking the first time any governmental body released such a report. Its findings indicated that self-identified bisexuals made up the largest single population within the LGBT community in the United States. In each of the report's studies, more women identified as bisexual than lesbian, though fewer men identified as bisexual than gay. Also in 2011, a longitudinal study of sexual minority women (bisexual, unlabeled, and lesbian) found that over 10 years, "more women adopted bisexual/unlabeled identities than relinquished them". Of those who began the study identifying as bisexual, 92% identified as bisexual or unlabeled 10 years later, and 61% of those who began as unlabeled identified as bisexual or unlabeled 10 years later.

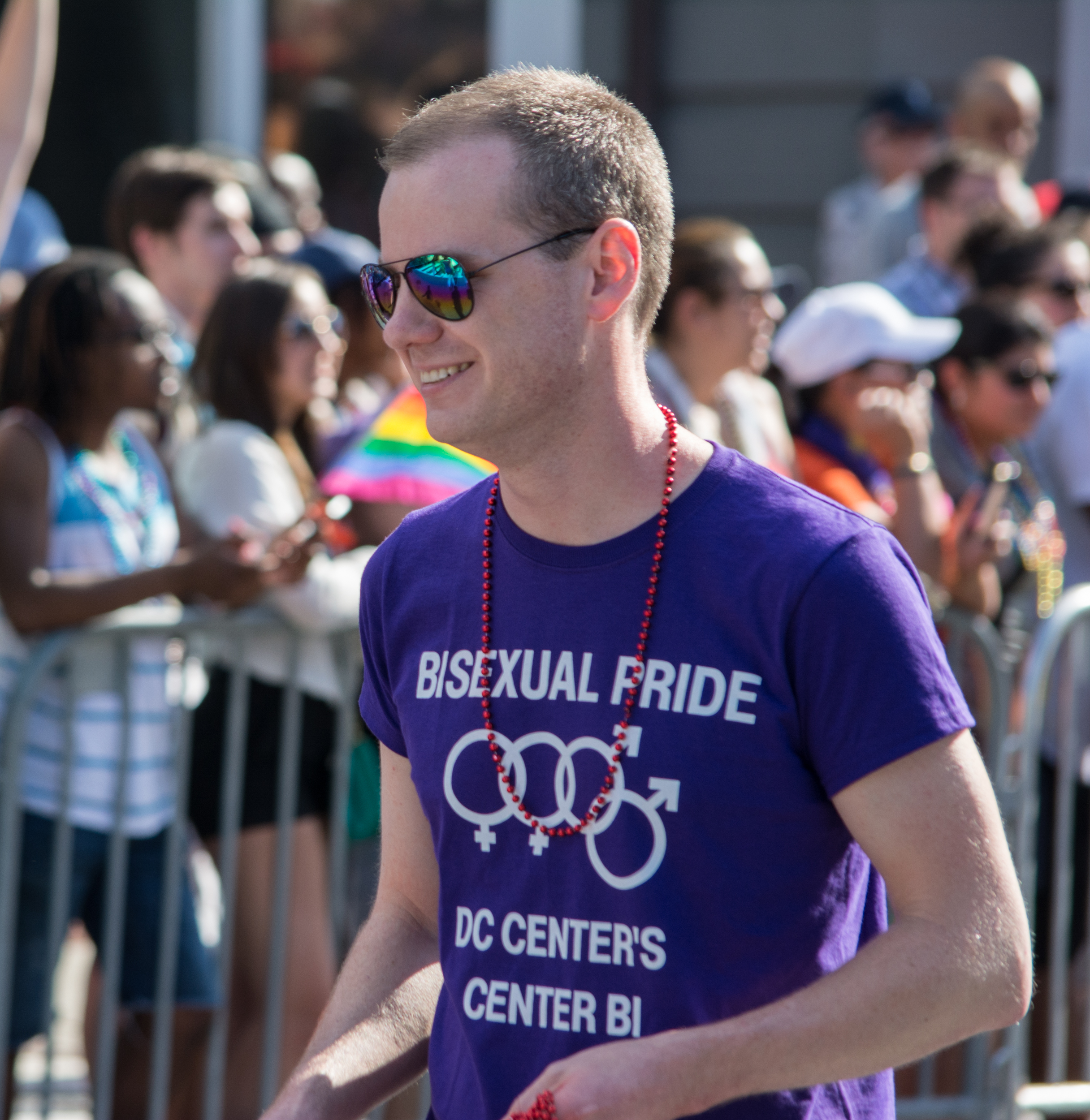
Bisexual Pride supporter at Capital Pride in Washington, DC, June 2014

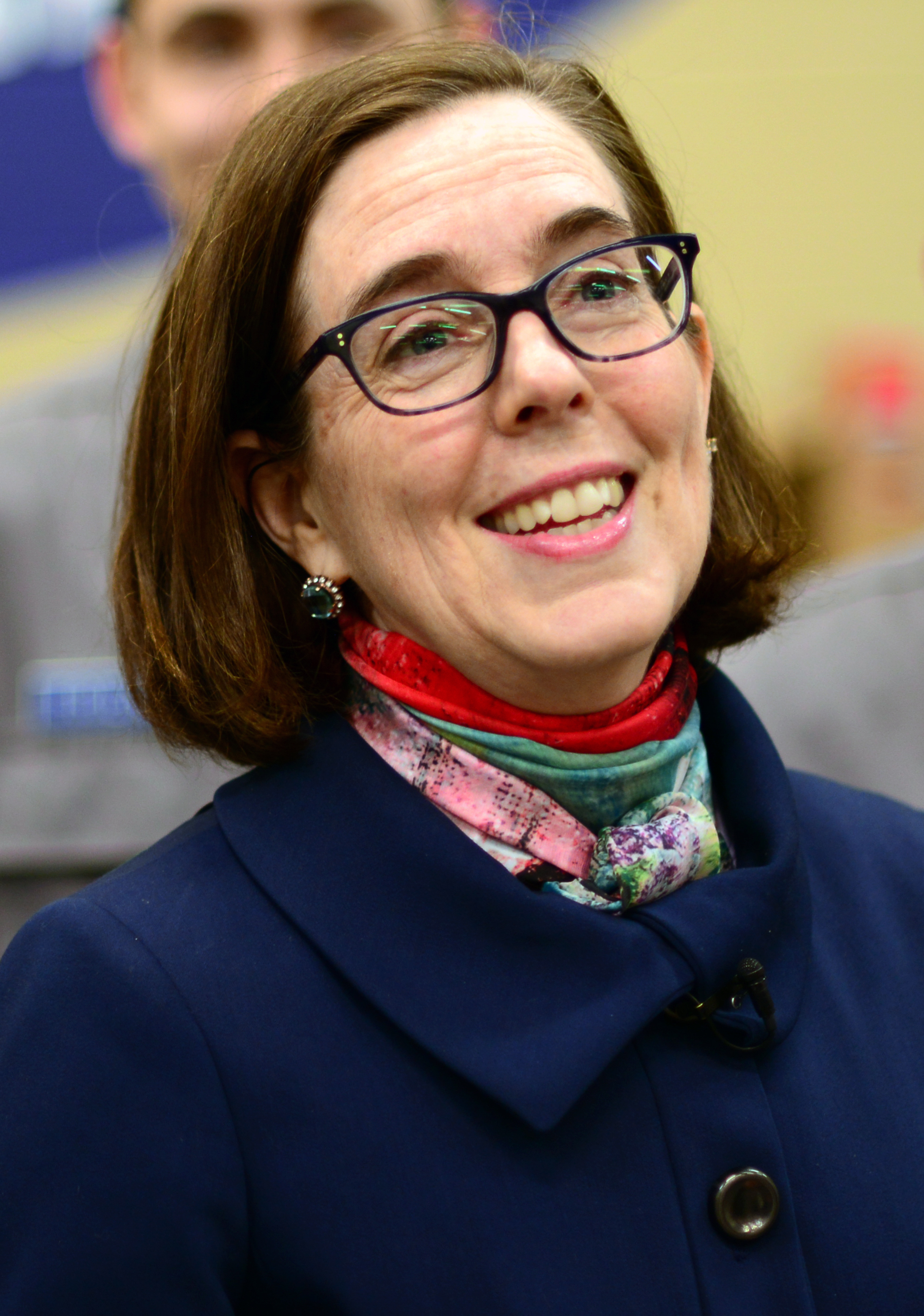
Oregon Governor Kate Brown was the United States' first openly bisexual governor; she was elected in 2016.

In September 2012, Berkeley, California, became the first city in America to officially proclaim a day recognizing bisexuals. The Berkeley City Council unanimously and without discussion declared September 23 as Bisexual Pride and Bi Visibility Day. In 2013 on Bisexual Pride and Bi Visibility Day, the White House held a closed-door meeting with about 30 bisexual advocates so they could meet with government officials and discuss issues of specific importance to the bisexual community; this was the first bi-specific event ever hosted by any White House. Another important contribution to bisexual visibility came in 2014, when the Bisexual Research Collaborative on Health (BiRCH) was founded to search for ways to raise public awareness of bisexual health issues, as well as to continue high-level discussions of bisexual health research and plan a national conference.

As for law and politics, in November 2012 Kyrsten Sinema was elected to the House of Representatives, becoming the first openly bisexual member of Congress in American history. In 2013 BiLaw, the first American national organization of bisexual lawyers, law professors, law students, and their allies, was founded. In February 2015 Kate Brown became the first openly bisexual governor in the United States, upon the resignation of Oregon's chief executive. On June 26, 2015, the Supreme Court ruled by a 5-to-4 vote in Obergefell v. Hodges that the Constitution guarantees a right to same-sex marriage, legalizing it throughout the United States; this increased the rights of bisexual people in America wishing to marry their same-sex partners. Another important victory came later that year, when the U.S. Equal Employment Opportunity Commission concluded that Title VII of the 1964 Civil Rights Act does not allow sexual orientation discrimination in employment because it is a form of sex discrimination. In 2016, Kate Brown was elected as governor of Oregon, and thus became the first openly bisexual person elected as a United States governor (and indeed the first openly LGBT person elected as such). In 2018, Kyrsten Sinema became the first openly bisexual person to win a major party nomination to run for a U.S. Senate seat, and later that year she became the first openly bisexual person elected to the U.S. Senate. As well, Kate Brown was re-elected that year as governor of Oregon. In 2020 Christy Holstege became the first openly bisexual mayor in America, as mayor of Palm Springs, California.

In the first large-scale government survey measuring Americans' sexual orientation, the NHIS reported in July 2014 that 0.7 percent of Americans identify as bisexual. A 2016 survey cited by CNN said that bisexuality was increasing in the United States, with 5.5% of women and 2% of men identifying as bisexual compared with 3.9% and 1.2% respectively in an earlier survey. However the NHIS reported the same year that bisexuality was at .8% for men, and 1.2% for women, only changing slightly the next year.

In 2017, the Department of Justice filed an amicus brief in the 2nd U.S. Circuit Court of Appeals making the argument that Title VII of the Civil Rights Act of 1964 does not prohibit discrimination against employees who are bisexual or gay.

In 2018 America's first city-wide Bi Pride event was held, in West Hollywood.

=== 2020s ===
In 2021 Pennsylvania governor Tom Wolf became the first governor in the United States to issue a statement recognizing Bisexual Pride Day. Estimates of Bisexual and fluid Americans range from ten to fifty million.

== Notable American bisexuals ==
- Gregg Araki is an independent filmmaker. He is involved in New Queer Cinema. Araki self-identified as gay until 1997, when he entered a relationship with actress Kathleen Robertson, whom he directed in Nowhere.
- Billie Joe Armstrong, lead singer for the band Green Day.
- Drew Barrymore, actress and director, came out as bisexual in an interview with Contact Music in 2003, where she said "Do I like women sexually? Yeah, I do. Totally. I have always considered myself bisexual." Barrymore was quoted in 2004 as saying, "A woman and a woman together are beautiful, just as a man and a woman together are beautiful. Being with a woman is like exploring your own body, but through someone else. When I was younger I used to go with lots of women."
- Kate Brown became the first openly bisexual governor in the United States, as governor of Oregon, in 2015. She had been elected as the Oregon Secretary of State in 2008, becoming America's first openly bisexual statewide officeholder.
- Aaron Carter, a musician, came out as bisexual via Twitter on August 5, 2017.
- John Cheever, novelist, had sexual relationships with both men and women and was described by his son as bisexual.
- Margaret Cho, comedian.
- Clive Davis is a record producer and music industry executive. He has won five Grammy Awards and is a member of the Rock and Roll Hall of Fame as a non-performer. From 1967 to 1973, Davis was the president of Columbia Records. He came out as bisexual in 2013.
- Raúl Esparza is a Cuban-American stage actor, singer, and voice artist noted for his award-winning performances in Broadway shows. He came out as bisexual in 2007.

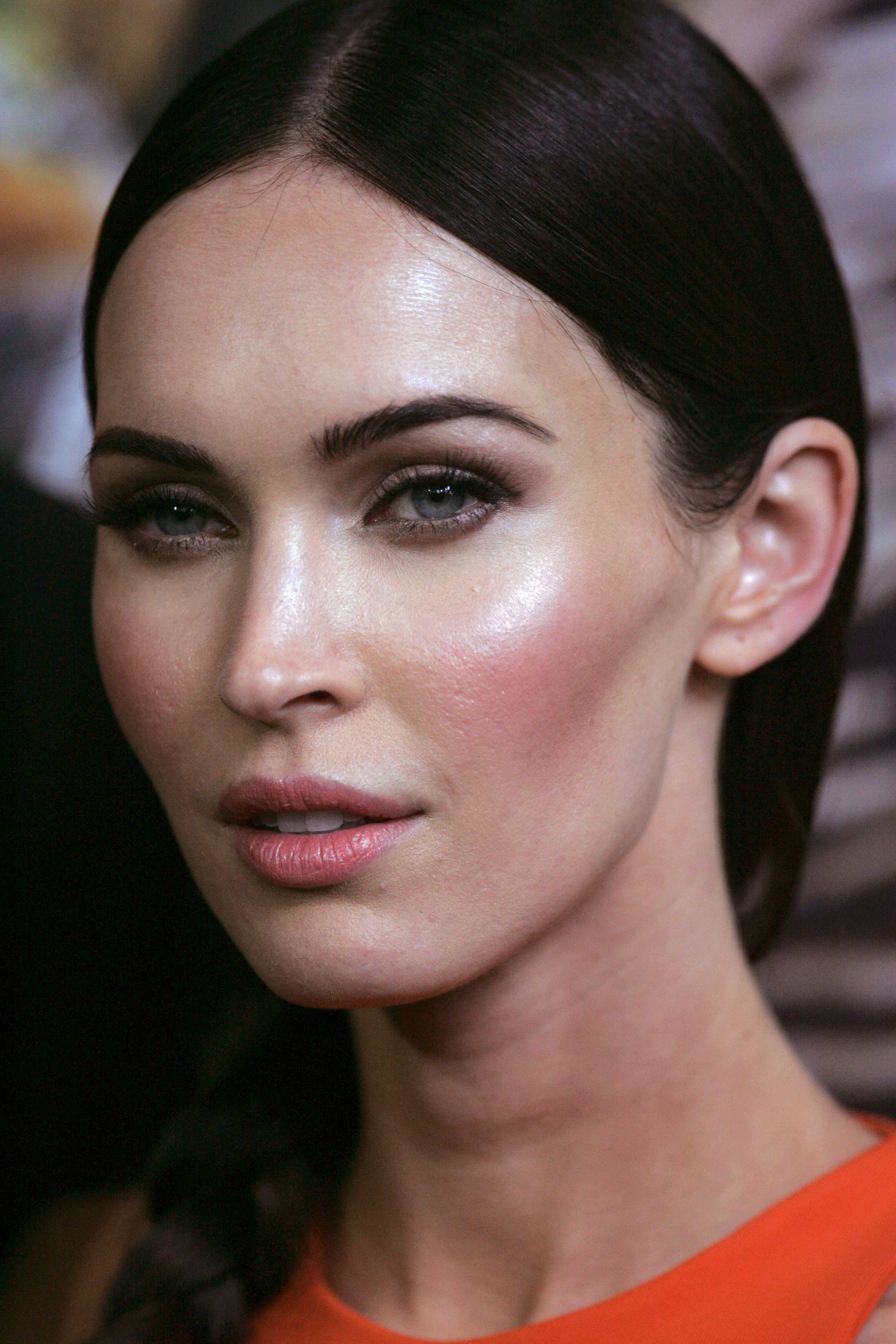
Megan Fox

- Megan Fox, an actress and model, came out as bisexual in 2009.
- Lady Gaga, a multiplatinum-selling singer and LGBT rights activist, came out as bisexual in 2009.
- Jack Gantos is an American author of children's books renowned for his fictional character Joey Pigza, a boy with attention-deficit hyperactivity disorder. Gantos has won several literary awards, including the Newbery Honor, the Newbery Medal, the Printz Honor, and the Sibert Honor from the American Library Association.
- Angelina Jolie, an Academy Award-winning actress, came out as bisexual in 2003. When asked if she was bisexual, Jolie responded, "Of course. If I fell in love with a woman tomorrow, would I feel that it's okay to want to kiss and touch her? If I fell in love with her? Absolutely! Yes!"

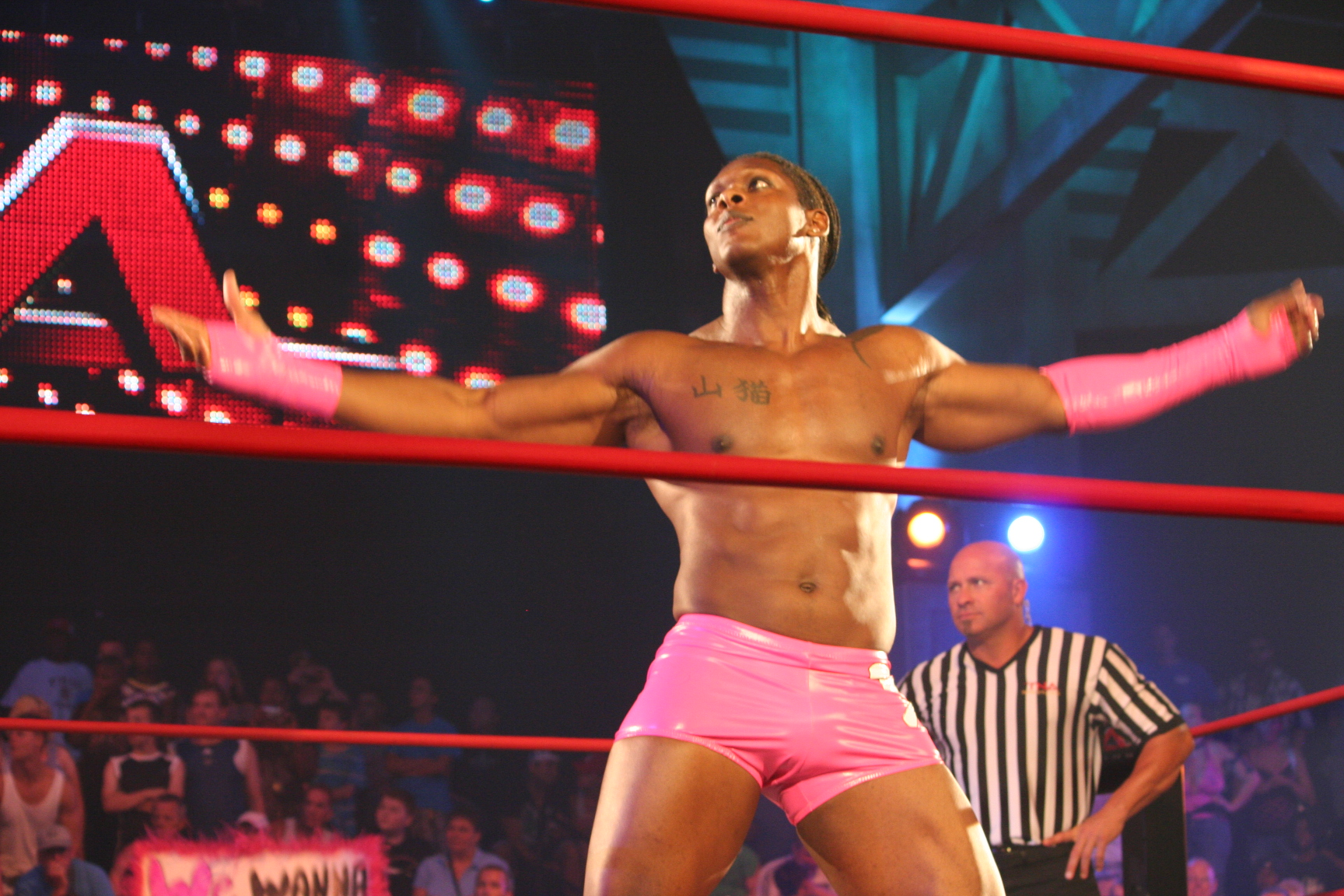
Wrestler Orlando Jordan

- Orlando Jordan is an openly bisexual wrestler.
- Romona Lofton, better known by her pen name Sapphire, is an American author and performance poet. She is best known for her novel Push.
- Robyn Ochs helped found the Boston Bisexual Network in 1983, and the Bisexual Resource Center in 1985. She is also the editor of the Bisexual Resource Guide and the coeditor of the anthology Getting Bi: Voices of Bisexuals Around the World.

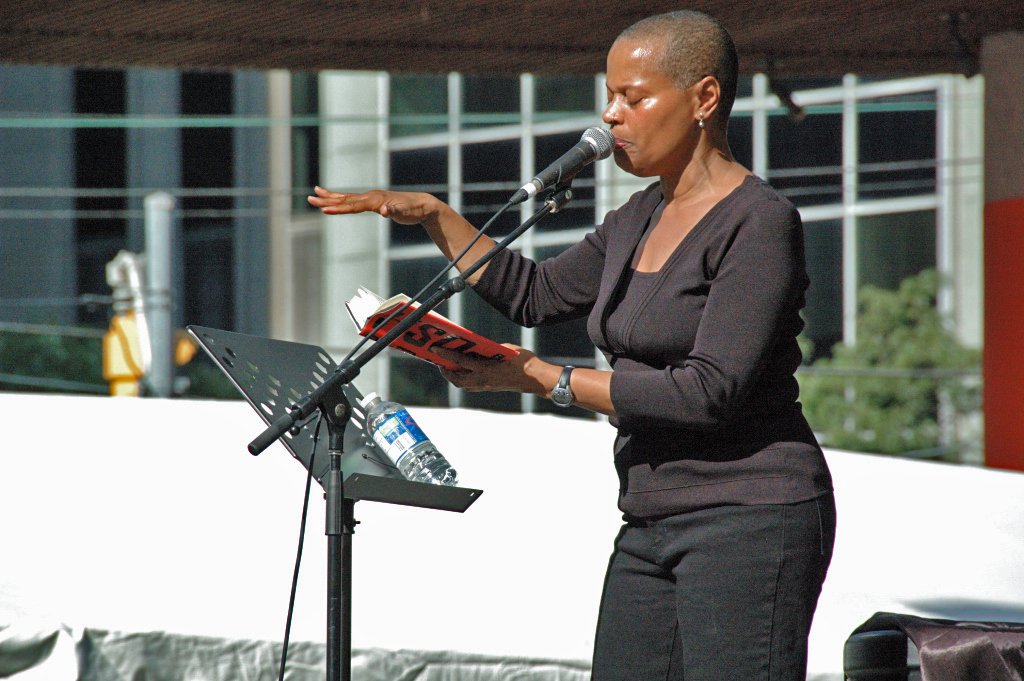
Author Sapphire

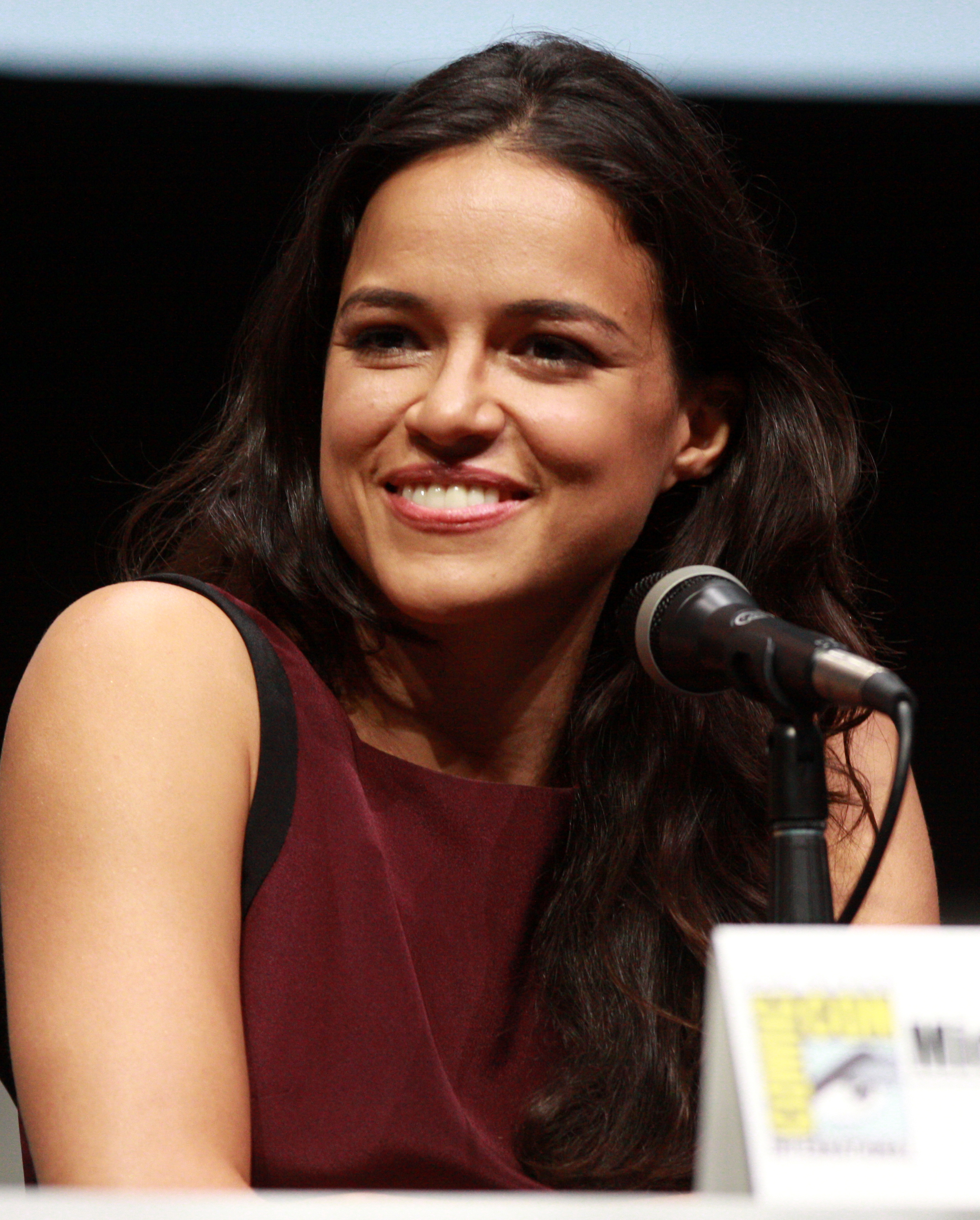
Michelle Rodriguez

- Michelle Rodriguez is an American actress, screenwriter, and disc jockey. Rodriguez got her breakout role in the independent film Girlfight, which was met with critical acclaim for her performance as a troubled boxer, and earned her several awards, including the Independent Spirit Award and Gotham Award for Best Debut Performance. The following year, she made her Hollywood debut starring as Letty Ortiz in the blockbuster film The Fast and the Furious, and reprised her role with its sequels Fast & Furious and Fast & Furious 6.
- Kyle Schickner is a film producer, writer, director, actor, and bisexual rights activist. He is the founder of FenceSitter Films, a production company devoted to entertainment for sexual minorities, women, and ethnic minorities. While in college, inspired by hearing a talk given by bisexual rights activist Lani Ka'ahumanu, he formed BIAS (Bisexuals Achieving Solidarity), the first college bisexual rights group in the United States.
- Kyrsten Sinema, elected to the House of Representatives in 2012 and the Senate in 2018, is the first openly bisexual member of Congress and the first openly bisexual Senator in American history.
- Ron Jackson Suresha is an author and anthologist of books centering on bisexual and gay men's subcultures, particularly the Bear community.
- Mike White is an American writer, director, actor, and producer for television and film and the winner of the Independent Spirit John Cassavetes Award for Chuck & Buck. He was co-creator, co-executive producer, writer and actor for the HBO series Enlightened.

== Timeline of bisexual American history ==
- 1892: The word "bisexual" is first used in English in the sense of being sexually attracted to both males and females in Charles Gilbert Chaddock's direct translation of Kraft-Ebing's Psychopathia Sexualis.
- 1914: The first documented appearance of bisexual characters (female and male) in an American motion picture occurred in A Florida Enchantment, by Sidney Drew.
- 1966: Bisexual activist Robert A. Martin (aka Donny the Punk) (née Robert Martin, 1946–1996) founded the Student Homophile League at Columbia University and New York University; in 1967 Columbia University was the first University in the United States to officially recognize a gay student group.
- 1969: The Stonewall Rebellion, considered the beginning of the modern LGBT rights movement, occurred at the Stonewall bar in 1969. Bar patrons, including bisexuals, stood up to the police during a raid.
- 1970: In commemoration of the Stonewall Rebellion, the first LGBT pride march was held. Bisexual activist Brenda Howard is known as the "Mother of Pride" for her work in coordinating this march.
- 1972: Bill Beasley, a bisexual veteran of the Civil Rights Movement, was the core organizer of first Los Angeles Gay Pride March and active with the Gay Liberation Front.
- 1972: A Quaker group, the Committee of Friends on Bisexuality, issued the "Ithaca Statement on Bisexuality" supporting bisexuals.
  The Statement, which may have been "the first public declaration of the bisexual movement" and "was certainly the first statement on bisexuality issued by an American religious assembly," appeared in the Quaker Friends Journal and The Advocate in 1972.
  Presently Quakers have varying opinions on LGBTQ people and rights, with some Quaker groups more accepting than others.
- 1974: In New York City Dr. Fritz Klein founded the Bisexual Forum, the first support group for the bisexual community.
- 1977: Alan Rockway co-authored the first successful gay rights ordinance put to public vote in America, in Dade County, Florida. When Anita Bryant initiated the anti-gay "Save Our Children" campaign in response to the ordinance, Dr. Rockway conceived of and initiated a national "gaycott" of Florida orange juice. The Florida Citrus Commission canceled Ms. Bryant's million dollar contract as a result of the "gaycott".
- 1978: Dr. Fritz Klein first described the Klein Sexual Orientation Grid (KSOG), which attempts to measure sexual orientation by expanding upon the earlier Kinsey scale, in his 1978 book The Bisexual Option.
- 1979: A. Billy S. Jones, a founding member of National Coalition of Black Lesbians and Gays, helped organize the first black gay delegation to meet with President Carter's White House staff. Jones was also a core organizer of the 1979 National March on Washington for Lesbian and Gay Rights, and was a key organizer for "Third world conference: When will the ignorance end?" the first national gay and lesbian people of color conference.
- 1979: Dr. Marvin Colter and John Soroczak co-founded Arete, The Bisexual Center of Southern California in Whittier, California, a support and social group for bisexuals.
- 1983: The Boston Bisexual Women's Network, the oldest existing bisexual women's group, was founded in 1983 and began publishing their bi-monthly newsletter, BI Women. It is the longest-existing bisexual newsletter in the US.
- 1983: BiPOL, the first and oldest bisexual political organization, was founded in San Francisco by Autumn Courtney, Lani Ka'ahumanu, Arlene Krantz, David Lourea, Bill Mack, Alan Rockway, and Maggi Rubenstein.
- 1984: BiPOL sponsored the first bisexual rights rally, which was held outside the Democratic National Convention in San Francisco. The rally featured nine speakers from civil rights groups allied with the bisexual movement.
- 1984: A. Billy S. Jones helped organize the first federally funded national "AIDS in the Black Community Conference" in Washington, D.C.
- 1984: The First East Coast Conference on Bisexuality (which was also the first regional bisexual conference in the US) was held at the Storrs School of Social Work at the University of Connecticut, with about 150 people participating.
- 1985: The Bisexual Resource Center (BRC) was founded.
- 1985: Cynthia Slater (1945-1989), an early outspoken bisexual and HIV positive woman, organized the first Women's HIV/AIDS Information Switchboard.
- 1986: BiPOL's Autumn Courtney was elected co-chair of San Francisco's Lesbian Gay Freedom Day Pride Parade Committee; she was the first openly bisexual person to hold this sort of position in the United States.
- 1987: Veneita Porter, director of the New York State Office of AIDS Discrimination, helped design the first educational projects and trainings for state workers, hearing judges and legal staff.
- 1987: The New York Area Bisexual Network (NYABN) was founded.
- 1987: The East Coast Bisexual Network established the first Bisexual History Archives with Robyn Ochs' initial collection; archivist Clare Morton hosted researchers.
- 1987: The Bay Area Bisexual Network, the oldest and largest bisexual group in the San Francisco Bay Area, was founded by Lani Ka'ahumanu, Ann Justi and Maggi Rubenstein.
- 1987: A group of 75 bisexuals marched in the Second National March on Washington for Lesbian and Gay Rights, which was the first nationwide bisexual gathering. The article "The Bisexual Movement: Are We Visible Yet?", by Lani Ka'ahumanu, appeared in the official Civil Disobedience Handbook for the March. It was the first article about bisexuals and the emerging bisexual movement to be published in a national lesbian or gay publication.
- 1988: Gary North published the first national bisexual newsletter, called Bisexuality: News, Views, and Networking.
- 1989: In 1989 Cliff Arnesen testified before the U.S. Congress on behalf of bisexual, lesbian, and gay veteran's issues. He was the first veteran to testify about bisexual, lesbian, and gay issues and the first openly non-heterosexual veteran to testify on Capitol Hill about veteran's issues in general. He testified on May 3, 1989, during formal hearings held before the U.S. House Committee on Veterans Affairs: Subcommittee on Oversight and Investigations.
- 1990: The North American Bisexual Network, the first national bisexual organization, was founded. NABN would later change its name to BiNet USA. It had its first meeting at the first National Bisexual Conference in America. This first conference was held in San Francisco, and sponsored by BiPOL. Bisexual health was one of eight workshop tracks at the conference, and the "NAMES Project" quilt was displayed with bisexual quilt pieces. Over 450 people attended from 20 states and 5 countries, and the mayor of San Francisco sent a proclamation "commending the bisexual rights community for its leadership in the cause of social justice", and declaring June 23, 1990 Bisexual Pride Day. The conference also inspired attendees from Dallas to create the first bisexual group in Texas, called BiNet Dallas.
- 1990: Susan Carlton offered the first academic course on bisexuality in America at UC Berkeley.
- 1990: A film with a relationship between two bisexual women, called Henry and June, became the first film to receive the NC-17 rating from the Motion Picture Association of America (MPAA).
- 1991: Psychologists Sari Dworkin and Ron Fox became the founding co-chairs of the Task Force on Bisexual Issues of Division 44, the gay and lesbian group in the American Psychological Association.
- 1991: Liz Highleyman co-founded the Boston ACT UP IV League needle exchange, one of the first in the US.
- 1991: The Bay Area Bisexual Network began publishing the first national bisexual quarterly magazine, Anything That Moves: Beyond the Myths of Bisexuality, founded by Karla Rossi, who was the managing editor of the editorial collective until 1993.
- 1991: One of the seminal books in the history of the modern bisexual rights movement, Bi Any Other Name: Bisexual People Speak Out, an anthology edited by Loraine Hutchins and Lani Ka'ahumanu, was published.
- 1992: The Bisexual Connection (Minnesota) sponsored the First Annual Midwest Regional Bisexual Conference, BECAUSE (Bisexual Empowerment Conference: A Uniting, Supportive Experience).
- 1992: The South Florida Bisexual Network and the Florida International University's Stonewall Students Union co-sponsored the First Annual Southeast Regional Bisexual Conference. Thirty-five people from at least four southeastern states attended.
- 1992: Colorado voters approved by initiative an amendment to the Colorado state constitution (Amendment 2) that would have prevented any city, town, or county in the state from taking any legislative, executive, or judicial action to recognize bisexuals or gay people as a protected class.
- 1992-1994: Lani Ka'ahumanu served as project coordinator for an American Foundation for AIDS Research grant awarded to Lyon-Martin Women's Health Services. This was the first grant in the U.S. to target young high risk bisexual and lesbian women for HIV/AIDS prevention/education research. She created the "Peer Safer Sex Slut Team" with Cianna Stewart.
- 1993: Sheela Lambert wrote, produced, and hosted the first television series by and for bisexuals, called Bisexual Network. It aired for 13 weeks on NYC Public Access Cable.
- 1993: Ron Fox wrote the first large scale research study on bisexual identity, and established and maintained a comprehensive bibliography on bi research.
- 1993: The First Annual Northwest Regional Conference was sponsored by BiNet USA, the Seattle Bisexual Women's Network, and the Seattle Bisexual Men's Union. It was held in Seattle, and fifty-five people representing Washington, Oregon, Alaska, Montana, and British Columbia attended.
- 1993: The March on Washington for Lesbian, Gay and Bi Equal Rights and Liberation. As a result of lobbying by BiPOL (San Francisco), openly bisexual people held key leadership roles in local and regional organizing for the March, and for the first time bisexuals were included in the title of the March. Also, Lani Ka'ahumanu spoke at the rally, and over 1,000 people marched with the bisexual group. Coinciding with the March, BiNet USA, the Bisexual Resource Center (BRC), and the Washington, DC–-based Alliance of Multicultural Bisexuals (AMBi) sponsored the Second National Conference Celebrating Bisexuality in Washington, DC. Over 600 people attended from the US and Europe, making it at the time the largest Bisexual Conference ever held.
- 1993: Ron Fox authored the first large scale research study on bisexual identity, and established and maintained a comprehensive bibliography on bi research.
- 1996: In the Supreme Court case Romer v. Evans, the Court ruled in a 6–3 decision that the state constitutional amendment in Colorado preventing protected status based upon bisexuality or homosexuality did not satisfy the Equal Protection Clause.
- 1997: Dr. Fritz Klein founded the Journal of Bisexuality, the first academic, quarterly journal on bisexuality.
- 1996: Angel Fabian co-organized the National Task Force on AIDS Prevention's first Gay/Bisexual Young Men of Color Summit at Gay Men of Color Conference, Miami, Florida.
- 1997: At an LGBT PrideFest in Connecticut in 1997, Evelyn Mantilla came out as America's first openly bisexual state official.
- 1998: The first bisexual pride flag, designed by Michael Page, was unveiled on December 5, 1998.
- 1998: The American Institute of Bisexuality, a charity, was founded on July 23, 1998, by Fritz Klein M.D. to promote research and education about bisexuality.
- 1998: BiNet USA hosted the First National Institute on Bisexuality and HIV/AIDS.
- 1999: The first Celebrate Bisexuality Day, also known as Bisexual Pride and Bi Visibility Day, was organized by Michael Page, Gigi Raven Wilbur, and Wendy Curry. It is now observed every September 23.
- 1999: Dr. Fritz Klein founded the Journal of Bisexuality, the first academic, quarterly journal on bisexuality.
- 1999: Marshall Miller founded the BiHealth Program at Fenway Community Health, the first funded bisexual-specific program targeting bisexual people and MSMW (men who have sex with men and women) and WSWM (women who have sex with men and women) who don't identify as bisexual. The program published "Safer sex for bisexuals and their partners" brochures.
- 2000: The first anthology by bisexual people of faith, Blessed Bi Spirit (Continuum International 2000), was published. It was edited by Debra Kolodny.
- 2002: Pete Chvany, Luigi Ferrer, James Green, Loraine Hutchins and Monica McLemore presented at the Gay, Lesbian, Bisexual, Transgender, Queer and Intersex Health Summit, held in Boulder, Colorado, marking the first time bisexual people, transgender people, and intersex people were recognized as co-equal partners on the national level rather than gay and lesbian "allies" or tokens.
- 2002: Robyn Ochs delivered the first bi-focused keynote during the National Association of Lesbian and Gay Addiction Professionals.
- 2003: The Union for Reform Judaism retroactively applied its pro-rights policy on gays and lesbians to the bisexual and transgender communities, issuing a resolution titled, "Support for the Inclusion and Acceptance of the Transgender and Bisexual Communities".
- 2003: Women of Reform Judaism issued a statement describing their support for human and civil rights and the struggles of the bisexual and transgender communities, and saying, "Women of Reform Judaism accordingly: Calls for civil rights protections from all forms of discrimination against bisexual and transgender individuals; Urges that such legislation allows transgender individuals to be seen under the law as the gender by which they identify; and Calls upon sisterhoods to hold informative programs about the transgender and bisexual communities."
- 2003: The North American Conference on Bisexuality hosted a Bi Health Summit organized by Cheryl Dobinson, Luigi Ferrer and Ron Fox, and the first Bi People of Color Summit was coordinated by Angel Fabian and Penelope Williams.
- 2003: The Center for Sex and Culture, founded by Carol Queen and Robert Lawrence in 1994, opened its archive and sexuality research library, becoming the first public non-profit community-based space designed for adult sex education, including continuing professional education.
- 2003: Loraine Hutchins and Linda Poelzl graduated from The Institute for the Advanced Study of Human Sexuality's first California Sexological Bodyworkers Certification Training as part of new movement of somatic erotic educators.
- 2004: Lani Ka'ahumanu, Bobbi Keppel and the Safer Sex Sluts presented the first Safer Sex Workshop given at a joint national conference with American Society on Aging and National Association on Aging.
- 2005: The Queens Chapter of PFLAG announced the creation of the "Brenda Howard Memorial Award". This was the first time a major American LGBT organization named an award after an openly bisexual person.
- 2006: After a multi-year campaign, a Bisexual category was added to the Lambda Literary Awards, starting with the 2006 Awards.
- 2008: Kate Brown was elected as the Oregon Secretary of State in the 2008 elections, becoming America's first openly bisexual statewide officeholder.
- 2009: In October 2009, LGBT activist Amy Andre was appointed as executive director of the San Francisco Pride Celebration Committee, making her San Francisco Pride's first openly bisexual woman of color executive director.
- 2011: San Francisco's Human Rights Commission released a report on bisexual visibility, titled "Bisexual Invisibility: Impacts and Regulations". This was the first time any governmental body released such a report. The report showed, among other things, that self-identified bisexuals made up the largest single population within the LGBT community in the United States. In each study included in the report, more women identified as bisexual than lesbian, though fewer men identified as bisexual than gay.
- 2012: City Councilmember Marlene Pray joined the Doylestown, Pennsylvania council in 2012, though she resigned in 2013; she was the first openly bisexual office holder in Pennsylvania.
- 2012: Kyrsten Sinema (D-AZ) became the first openly bisexual person elected to the US Congress.
- 2012: On September 18, 2012, Berkeley, California, became the first city in the U.S. to officially proclaim a day recognizing bisexuals. The Berkeley City Council unanimously and without discussion declared Sept. 23 as Bisexual Pride and Bi Visibility Day.
- 2013: On Celebrate Bisexuality Day, also known as Bisexual Pride and Bi Visibility Day, the White House held a closed-door meeting with almost 30 bisexual advocates so they could meet with government officials and discuss issues of specific importance to the bisexual community; this was the first bi-specific event ever hosted by any White House.
- 2013: The Bi Writers Association, which promotes bisexual writers, books, and writing, announced the winners of its first Bisexual Book Awards. An awards ceremony was held at the Nuyorican Poets Café in New York City.
- 2013: BiLaw, the first American national organization of bisexual lawyers, law professors, law students, and their allies, was founded.
- 2014: Conner Mertens of the Division III Willamette Bearcats came out as bisexual, becoming the first active college football player at any level to come out.
- 2014: The Bisexual Resource Center, based in Boston, Massachusetts, declared March 2014 as the first Bisexual Health Awareness Month, with the theme "Bi the Way, Our Health Matters Too!"; it included the first social media campaign to address disparities in physical and mental health facing the bisexual community.
- 2014: The Bisexual Research Collaborative on Health (BiRCH) was founded to search for ways to raise public awareness of bisexual health issues, as well as to continue high-level discussions of bisexual health research and plan a national (American) conference.
- 2014: The book Bisexuality: Making the Invisible Visible in Faith Communities, the first book of its kind, was published. It is by the American authors Marie Alford-Harkey and Debra W. Haffner.
- 2014: BiNet USA declared the seven days surrounding Celebrate Bisexuality Day to be Bi Awareness Week, also called Bisexual Awareness Week. The week begins the Sunday before Celebrate Bisexuality Day.
- 2015: Kate Brown became the first openly bisexual governor in the United States, as governor of Oregon when the old governor resigned.
- 2015: J. Christopher Neal became the first openly bisexual New York City LGBT Pride March Grand Marshal.
- 2016: Kate Brown was elected as governor of Oregon, and thus became the first openly bisexual person elected as a United States governor (and indeed the first openly LGBT person elected as such).
- 2017: The Department of Justice filed an amicus brief in the 2nd U.S. Circuit Court of Appeals making the argument that Title VII of the Civil Rights Act of 1964 does not prohibit discrimination against employees who are bisexual or gay.
- 2017: The American Institute of Bisexuality provided funding for The Center for Sex Education's publication of 25 Great Lesson Plans About Sexual Orientation, which includes a number of resources and lesson plans on how to teach about bisexuality. Edited by T. Clark, T. Gilbert, K. Rayne.
- 2018: Megan Hunt, who was openly bisexual, became the first openly LGBTQ person elected to the state legislature of Nebraska.
- 2018: Katie Hill was elected as California’s first openly bisexual person, and first openly queer woman, to be a member of Congress.
- 2018: Mike Jacobs became the first sitting judge in the United States to come out as bisexual.
- 2018: Kyrsten Sinema became the first openly bisexual person to win a major party nomination to run for a U.S. Senate seat.
- 2018: America's first city-wide Bi Pride event was held, in West Hollywood.
- 2018: Kyrsten Sinema became the first openly bisexual person elected to the U.S. Senate.
- 2019: Antonio Brown was elected as Atlanta's first openly bisexual councilman.
- 2019: A one-day conference for bi+ people, Unico[r]n, was held on October 12, 2019, in San Francisco.
- 2020: The first San Francisco and East Bay BiCon was held on February 1 and 2, 2020, in San Francisco and Oakland.
- 2020: Christy Holstege became the first openly bisexual mayor in America, as mayor of Palm Springs, California.
- 2020: Alex Lee became the California State Assembly’s first openly bisexual member.
- 2020: Jessica Benham, who was openly bisexual, became the first openly LGBTQ+ woman elected to the Pennsylvania General Assembly.
- 2021: Pennsylvania governor Tom Wolf became the first governor in the United States to issue a statement recognizing Bisexual Pride Day.
- 2024: Molly Cook, who was openly bisexual, became the first openly LGBTQ+ person elected to the Texas Senate.

== See also ==
- History of bisexuality
