= Brenda Howard Memorial Award =

PFLAG award for bisexual activism

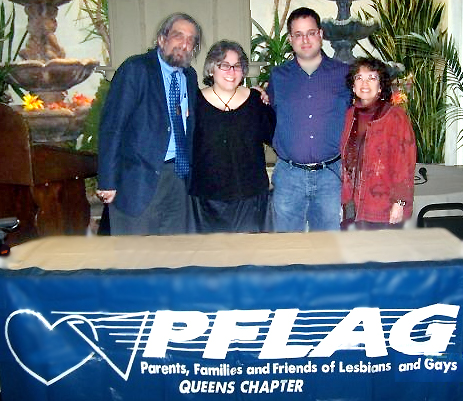
Winners of Brenda Howard Memorial Award (L to R) Larry Nelson 2005, Wendy Curry 2008, Tom Limoncelli 2006, and Wendy Moscow 2007.

The Brenda Howard Memorial Award is an award for activism created in 2005 by the Queens Chapter of PFLAG and named after Brenda Howard. It was the first award by a major American LGBT organization to be named after an openly bisexual person. The award, which is given annually, recognizes an individual whose work on behalf of the bisexual community and the greater LGBT community best exemplifies the vision, principles, and community service exemplified by Howard, and who serves as a positive and visible role model for the entire LGBT community.

Recipients of the award have included a number of notable activists, including Tom Limoncelli, Wendy Curry, Micah Kellner, Robyn Ochs, and H. Sharif Williams.

== Recipients ==
Year	Recipient	Notes
2005	Lawrence Nelson	Nelson is a long-time LGBT rights activist. He is a founding member and a current board member of PFLAG Queens as well as being an advisor to the student LGBT Group at Queensborough Community College.
2006	Tom Limoncelli	Limoncelli, who identifies as bisexual, is a long-time LGBT rights activist. He was the New Jersey emeritus BiNet USA delegate, has worked with Garden State Equality, and is a noted SysAdmin, and author.
2007	Wendy Moscow	Moscow, who identifies as bisexual, is a long-time LGBT rights activist, focusing on her home borough of Queens NYC. In the early 1980s she helped found the Lesbian and Gay Political Action Club of Queens and was also one of the founders of Queens Pride, where she served as their March Committee co-chair from inception until 2001, and was a Grand Marshal of the 2006 parade.
2008	Wendy Curry	Curry, who identifies as bisexual, is a long time LGBT rights activist. They are one of the creators of Bisexual Pride Day and are President emeritus of BiNet USA.
2009	Micah Kellner	Kellner was the first openly bisexual person elected to the New York State Assembly.
2010	Lisa Jacobs	Jacobs, who identifies as bisexual, is a long time bisexual rights and gender non-conforming community rights activist. They are a founder and President emeritus of the Transcending Boundaries Conference and run the Gender Diverse Bisexuals group.
2011	Robyn Ochs	Ochs, who identifies as bisexual, is a bisexual rights activist, speaker, and author.
2012	Donna Redd	Redd, who identifies as a bisexual woman of color, is a longtime LGBT activist. She is the executive director of Sistahs in Search of Truth, Alliance, and Harmony (S.i.S.T.A.H.), a Brooklyn-based bisexual-led group founded in 1991, that serves all same gender loving (SGL) women.
2013	Cliff Arnesen	Arnesen is a bisexual army veteran (U.S. Army, Vietnam era), past president of the New England Gay, Lesbian & Bisexual Veterans, and a founding member and former National Vice President of Legislative Affairs of the Lesbian & Bisexual Veterans of America, now known as the American Veterans for Equal Rights (AVER).
2014	Estraven	Estraven is a Board Member Emeritus of BiNet USA, a director of the New York Area Bisexual Network, and writer on the topic of bisexual history and mental health. In 2006 they founded the Bisexual Discussion and Activity Group at NY state's Westchester County's The LOFT LGBT Community Center where they continue to act as a senior facilitator.
2015	H. Sharif Williams	Williams, who identifies as bisexual, is an LGBT rights activist, playwright, poet, essayist, spiritual teacher, sexual healer, scholar, activist, and social entrepreneur.
2016	Alexandra Bolles	Bolles, who identifies as bisexual, spearheads GLAAD's bisexual-related advocacy and serves as Senior Strategist – Campaigns & External Engagement. In 2016, Bolles was instrumental in the publication of In Focus: Reporting on the Bisexual Community, GLAAD's first media resource guide specifically about the bisexual community
2017	Denarii Grace	Grace is a writer, editor, singer-songwriter, and activist.
2018	Lynnette McFadzen	McFadzen, who identifies as bisexual, is the founder of The BiCast Podcast and is the President of BiNet USA.
2023	Diane Anderson-Minshall	Anderson-Minshall is the editor-in-chief and chief operations officer at New York-based GO Magazine, former CEO and editorial director of Pride Media Inc, and vice-president of the board of directors for GALECA: The Society of LGBTQ Entertainment Critics, which operates the Dorian Awards.
