= Lani Kaʻahumanu =

Canadian bisexual and feminist writer and activist

- Born: October 5, 1943 (age 82); Edmonton, Alberta, Canada
- Occupations: Author, editor and activist
- Writing career
- Period: Late 20th/early 21st century
- Genres: Books, essays, magazine articles
- Subjects: Feminism, bisexuality, HIV/health
- Notable work: Bi Any Other Name: Bisexual People Speak Out
- Movements: Feminism and LGBTQIA rights, health and elder issues
- Website: www.lanikaahumanu.com

Lani Kaʻahumanu (born October 5, 1943) is a Native Hawaiian bisexual and feminist writer and activist. She is openly bisexual and writes and speaks on sexuality issues frequently. She serves on the editorial board of the Journal of Bisexuality. She is also working on the books My Grassroots Are Showing: Stories, Speeches, and Special Affections and Passing For Other: Primal Creams and Forbidden Dreams – Poetry, Prose, and Performance Pieces. In 1974, she divorced her husband and moved to San Francisco, where she originally came out as a lesbian. She was a student leader in the nascent San Francisco State Women Studies Department, and in 1979, she became the first person in her family to graduate from college. Kaʻahumanu realized she was bisexual and came out again in 1980.

== Activism ==
=== 1980s ===
In 1983, in San Francisco, Kaʻahumanu, Autumn Courtney, Arlene Krantz, David Lourea, Bill Mack, Alan Rockway, and Maggi Rubenstein founded BiPOL, the first and oldest bisexual political organization. In 1987, Ann Justi conceived of the Bay Area Bisexual Network BABN after attending a conference held in New York by the East Coast Bisexual Network. Justi, Kaʻahumanu, Maggi Rubenstein, Ron Fox, Matt Le Grant, and many others organized the Bay Area Bisexual Network.

The article "The Bisexual Movement: Are We Visible Yet?", by Kaʻahumanu, appeared in the official Civil Disobedience Handbook for the 1987 March On Washington For Gay and Lesbian Rights; the march included the first nationwide bisexual gathering. Her article was the first article about bisexuals and the emerging bisexual movement to be published in a national lesbian or gay publication.

Kaʻahumanu is the co-editor with Loraine Hutchins of the anthology Bi Any Other Name: Bisexual People Speak Out (Alyson Publications, 1991). It is considered one of the seminal books in the history of the modern bisexual rights movement. Kaʻahumanu contributed the piece "Hapa Haole Wahine" to the anthology. After the anthology was forced to compete in the Lambda Literary Awards under the category Lesbian Anthology, and Directed by Desire: Collected Poems, a posthumous collection of the bisexual poet June Jordan’s work, had to compete (and won) in the category "Lesbian Poetry", BiNet USA led the bisexual community in a multi-year campaign eventually resulting in the addition of a Bisexual category, starting with the 2006 Awards.

=== 1990s ===
From 1992 until 1994, Kaʻahumanu served as project coordinator for an American Foundation for AIDS Research grant awarded to Lyon-Martin Women's Health Services. This was the first grant in U.S. history to target young high risk lesbian and bi women for HIV/AIDS prevention/education research. Kaʻahumanu also created "Peer Safer Sex Slut Team" with Cianna Stewart. Her work with the Safer Sex Sluts was recognized by Ms. Magazine in 1994 in their "50 Ways To Be A Feminist" issue.

In 1993, Kaʻahumanu spoke at the rally of the March on Washington for Lesbian, Gay and Bi Equal Rights and Liberation; she had conceived and led a successful national campaign to have bisexual people included in the title. She was the only out bisexual out of 18 speakers.

Also in 1993, for her 50th birthday, Kaʻahumanu wrote and modeled for Women En Large: Images of Fat Nudes (Books In Focus, 1994).

In 1994, Kaʻahumanu, Elias Farajaje-Jones, Laura Perez, and Victor Raymond, all from The Indigenous Queers/Bisexual Caucus, presented "Preaching to the Perverted or Fluid Desire," at the National HIV Prevention/Education Summit held by the Association of Physicians for Human Rights (now the Gay and Lesbian Medical Association).

Since the mid-1990s, she has facilitated sex and body positive workshops around the United States.

In 1996, "What's bisexuality got to do with it?" training was held in conjunction with California's Lesbian, Gay and AIDS LIFE Lobby and Institute. It was coordinated by Kaʻahumanu, Stephanie Berger, Elias Farajaje-Jones, Felicia Park-Rogers, Brandon Taylor, Roland Sintos Coloma, and Cianna Stewart. Sheela Lambert produced a Bisexual Health Care Report for the New York City Department of Health examining barriers to service for bisexual people accessing health and mental health services. Two focus groups were conducted separately with bisexual men and bisexual women in NYC to identify issues.

In 1998, BiNet USA hosted a National Institute on Bisexuality HIV/AIDS Summit with the National Gay Lesbian Health Association Conference, along with Kaʻahumanu, Lynda Doll of the Center for Disease Control, and Elias Farajaje-Jones, Luigi Ferrer, Ron Fox, Dr. Fritz Klein, Marshall Miller, Cianna Stewart and Joe Wright. In 1999, the Center for Disease Control/UCLA School of Nursing hosted a Bisexual People of Color HIV Prevention and Education Summit that was conceived by Bill Wedin and co-coordinated by Kaʻahumanu, with Elias Farajaje-Jones, Ron Fox, Karl Hamner, Dominique RosaNegra Leslie, and Cianna Stewart.

== Achievements ==
Kaʻahumanu was the first openly bisexual individual to be invited and to serve on a national gay and lesbian board, and as such completed her term with the National Gay and Lesbian Task Force board of directors in 2000. In 2004, Kaʻahumanu, along with Bobbi Keppel and the Safer Sex Sluts, presented the first Safer Sex Workshop given at a joint national conference with the American Society on Aging and the National Association on Aging.

== See also ==
- Bay Area Bisexual Network
- BiNet USA
- Bisexuality in the United States

== Bibliography ==
- Claude J. Summers (éd., 2004), The Encyclopaedia of Gay, Lesbian, Bisexual, Transgender & Queer Culture, Chicago. Entry « Bisexual Movements » (page 2) by Brett Genny Beemyn. Read online
- Kata Orndorff (1999), Bi Lives: Bisexual Women Tell Their Stories, See Sharp Press (chapter 8, Lani, p. 98–112).
