= Tom Limoncelli =

American activist (born 1968)

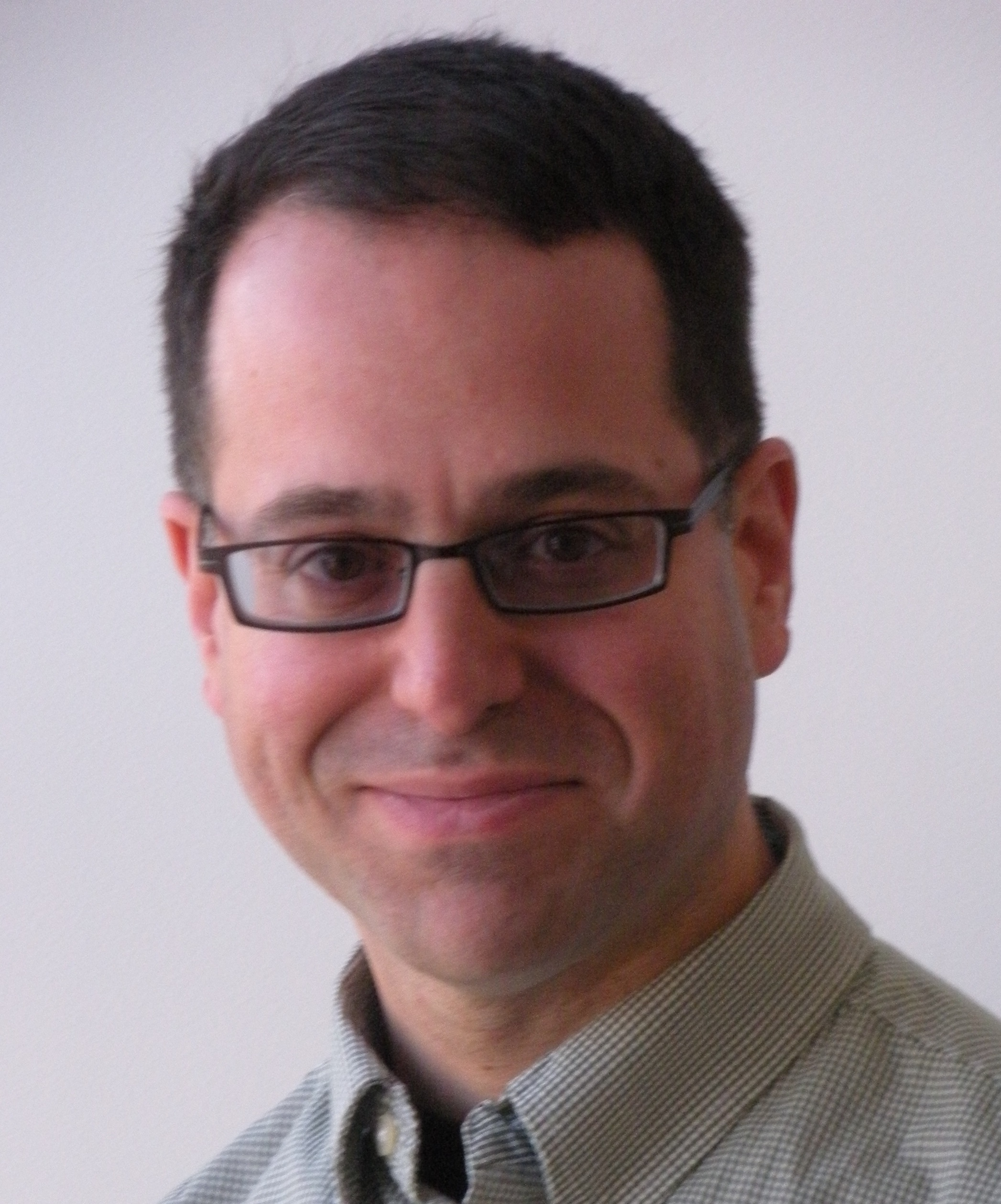
Tom Limoncelli

Tom Limoncelli (born December 2, 1968) is an American system administrator, author, and speaker. A system administrator and network engineer since 1987, he speaks at conferences around the world on topics ranging from firewall security to time management. He is the author of Time Management for System Administrators from O'Reilly; along with Christine Hogan, co-author of the book The Practice of System and Network Administration from Addison-Wesley, which won the 2005 SAGE Outstanding Achievement Award, and in 2007 with Peter H. Salus he has published a compilation of the best April Fools jokes created by the IETF entitled The Complete April Fools' Day RFCs.

He has also published papers at conferences such as the Usenix LISA on a wide variety of topics including innovative firewall techniques, coordinating massive network changes, models for improving customer support, and the security issues related to firing a system administrator.

== Biography ==
Limoncelli is the youngest of five children. He was born in New Haven, Connecticut and has lived in New Jersey since the age of four. He holds a Bachelor of Arts in Computer Science from Drew University in Madison, New Jersey.

He is a Site Reliability Engineer at Stack Exchange. Before that, he was a systems administrator in the New York City office of Google. He has previously been Director, IT Services for Cibernet Corporation, Director of Operations at Lumeta and also worked at Bell Labs / Lucent Technologies where he ran the Internet gateway and networks used by the scientists as well as consulted internally to various business units.

== Work for bisexual rights ==
Limoncelli started his activism on campus when he was a student at Drew University. He facilitated a men's support group that was part of the Gay Activists Alliance in Morris County in 1989–1990.

In 1991-2 he worked on New Jersey's successful effort to amend the New Jersey's Law Against Discrimination, to add "sexual or affectional orientation" for protection in housing, hiring, banking, and public accommodations.

He served as outreach co-chair and logistics coordinator. He co-created BiNet/NJ (now known as BiZone) in 1991. He was vice-president, then president of the New Jersey Lesbian and Gay Coalition 1994–1996, which included such accomplishments as the creation of a community center, spinning off the NJ Pride Parade as a separate organization, modifying the by-laws to be fully bisexual and transgender inclusive, participation in the 1993 March on Washington and Stonewall 25, and other projects.

He has worked with BiNet USA since 1992 including four years spent as the Regional Organizer from the Tri-State area region. He edited the New Jersey section of the Bisexual Resource Guide for much of the 1990s.

Limoncelli has worked with the Tri-State Bisexual Conferences which he created/co-chaired in 1996 (NYC, NY), was advisor to in 1997 (Hartford, CT), co-chair in 1999 (New Brunswick NJ), and on the planning committee of the highly successful 2000 (NYU Campus, NY) conference.

Limoncelli has been active in Internet activism. Since 1987 he has used the Internet as an organizing tool. He maintained information about the 1993 March on Washington and Stonewall 25 events on the Internet, and was one of a handful of people that since 1992 organized to keep the idea alive that there should be a Stonewall 25 celebration in NYC in 1994.

AT&T's LEAGUE (Lesbian and Gay United Employees) organization awarded him their 1995 LEAGUE Community Involvement Award (Political), and in 1997 the New Jersey Lesbian and Gay Coalition awarded him their "Honor" lifetime achievement award for his activism.

He has written two books, contributed to the anthology "Getting Bi: Voices of Bisexuals Around the World", edited by Robyn Ochs and Sarah E. Rowley, and is the creator of BiSquish, an online journal that reported news and events for the bisexual community until September 7, 2006.

In 2006 he received the Brenda Howard Award from the Queens branch of PFLAG.

== Partial bibliography ==
- The Practice of System and Network Administration (Addison-Wesley), 2001, by Thomas A. Limoncelli and Christine Hogan ISBN 0-201-70271-1
- Time Management for System Administrators by Thomas A. Limoncelli (O'Reilly), 2005 ISBN 0-596-00783-3
- The Practice of System and Network Administration (2nd Edition) (Addison-Wesley), 2007, by Thomas A. Limoncelli, Christine Hogan, and Strata R. Chalup ISBN 0-321-49266-8
- The Complete April Fools' Day RFCs (Peer-to-Peer Communications Inc.) by Thomas A. Limoncelli and Peter H. Salus, 2007 ISBN 1-57398-042-0
- The Practice of System and Network Administration, Volume 1 (3rd Edition) (Addison-Wesley), 2016, by Thomas A. Limoncelli, Christine Hogan, and Strata R. Chalup ISBN 978-0-321-91916-8
- The Practice of Cloud System Administration: Designing and Operating Large Distributed Systems, Volume 2 (Addison-Wesley), 2014, by Thomas A. Limoncelli, Christine Hogan, and Strata R. Chalup ISBN 978-0-321-94318-7
