= Wendy Curry =

American bixesual rights activist (born 1966)

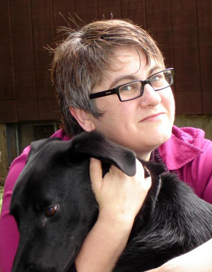
- Curry with one of her rescued dogs
- Born: September 1966 (age 59); Maine, United States
- Movement: Animal rescue, LGBT rights/bisexual rights
- Spouse: Brian Curry
- Children: 1 daughter
- Awards: Brenda Howard Memorial Award

Wendy Curry (born September 1966) is an American bisexual rights activist and animal rescue advocate.

== Career and civil rights work ==
She was the President of BiNet USA, an American national bisexual civil rights organization, a position she assumed in 2006. Previously she had served as the organization's Secretary and vice-president. In 2009, Curry was the recipient of the Brenda Howard Memorial Award presented by the Queens Chapter of PFLAG.

Ms. Curry is also on the planning committees for the Transcending Boundaries Conference.

In 1999, Curry along with fellow U.S. bisexual rights activists Michael Page of Florida and Gigi Raven Wilbur from Texas started the observation of Celebrate Bisexuality Day. To quote Curry, "We were sitting around at one of the annual bi conventions, venting and someone, I think it was Gigi said we should have a party. We all loved the great bisexual, Freddie Mercury. His birthday was in September, so why not Sept? We wanted a weekend day to ensure the most people would do something. Gigi's birthday was Sept 23rd. It fell on a weekend day, so poof! We had a day." This event has grown in popularity and now a wide variety of annual celebrations take place on September 23 throughout Canada, the United States, Europe, and Australia.

She is employed as a software engineer.

== Personal life ==
She is from Maine, and now resides in New Hampshire with her husband Brian and their daughter.

== See also ==
- International Conference on Bisexuality
