= Gigi Raven Wilbur =

American bisexual rights activist and writer

Gigi Raven Wilbur is an American bisexual rights activist and writer. They have a bachelor's degree in philosophy and a master's degree in social work. Wilbur has been regarded as among the most influential figures in bisexual and gender-diverse activism by fellow LGBTQ activist Cecilia Millers.

== Career and activism ==
Wilbur was a state organizer in Texas with a bisexuality radio show, and a coordinator for BiNet USA. In 1999, the first Celebrate Bisexuality Day was organized by them, Wendy Curry, and Michael Page. The date was chosen both because it is Wilbur's birthday and as a tribute to Freddie Mercury, a bisexual icon admired by the founders.

Wilbur has been involved with the Radical Faeries, the transgender and intersex communities, the spirit-sexualist and pagan movements, and the BDSM scene. They are the founder and Sacred Harlot of the Temple of Aphrodite at Dragons Wylde Ranch, a sex-positive spiritual retreat near Bastrop, Texas, operated by the Earth Spirit Alliance.

Wilbur has contributed to academic and activist literature, notably with the essay "Walking in the Shadows: Third Gender and Spirituality" in the anthology Trans/forming Feminisms: Trans/feminist Voices Speak Out (2006), where they explore the spiritual and social dimensions of being intersex.

Wilbur also hosted the long-running radio show "After Hours" in Houston, and later launched the podcast "Adult Bedtime Stories," which reached over 100,000 downloads worldwide.

== Personal life ==
As of 2008, Wilbur lives in Houston, Texas, and is the coordinator of the adult campground and the sex-positive Temple of Aphrodite at Dragons Wylde Ranch.

Wilbur is intersex, and have said they identify as third gender, neither male nor female. Wilbur stated in a 2008 interview, "my birth gender was altered shortly after I was born ... I am hermaphrodite. That is my true gender." They accept any pronouns, but prefer they/them.

Wilbur has spoken openly about growing up with learning disabilities (dyslexia, ADHD) and overcoming social and academic barriers to earn their degrees. They have described their journey as one of embracing all aspects of their identity: dyslexic, ADHD, intersex, and bisexual.

== Philosophy and spirituality ==
Wilbur's activism is rooted in spiritual practice. As a pagan and sex-positive priestess, they advocate for reclaiming sexuality as sacred and healing. They argue against the binary gender system and promote the recognition of a gender spectrum, drawing from ancient traditions where third-gender individuals held respected roles as shamans, healers, and spiritual guides.

Wilbur has written about the emotional, moral, and spiritual implications of being intersex, and has criticized non-consensual medical interventions on intersex infants.

== Awards ==
In 1999, Wilbur was awarded the American Institute of Bisexuality Globe Award for outstanding service to the bisexual world community.

== Selected works ==
They are the author of The Dominant's Handbook: An Intimate Guide to BDSM Play, and published the essay "Walking in the Shadows: Third Gender and Spirituality" (about being intersex) in Trans/Forming Feminism, Trans-feminist Voices Speak Out, edited by Krista Scott-Dixon. As of 2008, they publish a column in the pagan publication Rogue Moon.
