= Loraine Hutchins =

American author, activist and sex educator (1948–2025)

- Born: 1948
- Died: November 2025 (aged 77)
- Occupations: Author, editor in chief, cultural critic and academic
- Writing career
- Period: Late 20th, early 21st century
- Genres: Books, essays, magazine articles
- Subjects: Feminism, bisexuality
- Notable work: Bi Any Other Name
- Literary movement: Feminism and LGBT rights movement
- Website: lorainehutchins.com

Loraine Hutchins (1948 – November 2025) was an American bisexual and feminist author, activist, and sex educator.

== Life and career ==
Hutchins rose to prominence as co-editor (with Lani Kaʻahumanu) of Bi Any Other Name, an anthology that is one of the seminal books in the bisexual rights movement. Hutchins contributed the pieces "Letting Go: An Interview with John Horne" and "Love That Kink" to that anthology. After the anthology was forced to compete in the Lambda Literary Awards under the category "Lesbian Anthology", and Directed by Desire: Collected Poems, a posthumous collection of the bisexual poet June Jordan’s work, had to compete (and won) in the category "Lesbian Poetry", BiNet USA led the bisexual community in a multi-year campaign eventually resulting in the addition of a Bisexual category, starting with the 2006 Awards.

She was a graduate of The Institute for the Advanced Study of Human Sexuality's Sexological Bodyworkers Certification Training program. She taught Intro to Women's Studies, Intro to LGBT Studies, Women's Health, and Health Issues in Sexuality at two different campuses in the Washington, D.C., area.

In June 2006, Hutchins delivered the keynote address at the Ninth International Conference On Bisexuality, Gender And Sexual Diversity (9ICB).

In October 2009, Hutchins was honored as a "Community Pioneer" by the Rainbow History Project in Washington, D.C., for her activist work.

In November 2025, it was announced that Hutchins had died at the age of 77.

== Selected bibliography ==
=== Books ===
- Bi Any Other Name: Bisexual People Speak Out co-edited with Lani Kaʻahumanu (1991)
- Sexuality Religion and the Sacred: Bisexual Pansexual and Polysexual co-edited with H. Sharif Williams (2012)
- Some Women, edited by Laura Antoniou (Hutchins did not edit this book, but contributed "Letter to David".) (1995)
