= H. Sharif Williams =

American cultural studies scholar

Hameed Sharif "Herukhuti" Williams is an American cultural studies scholar whose work focuses on sex research and education. He is also a systems theorist, culture and interdisciplinary social scientist, journalist and public speaker who has written about and lectured on bisexuality particularly among people of African descent.

== Early life and education ==
Williams was born and raised in Brooklyn, New York, with a heritage steeped in the black radical and socialist traditions. His maternal great-grandmother was Garveyite, a member of the Universal Negro Improvement Association, and active in the Moorish Science Temple. His maternal grandparents were members of the American Labor Party (ALP), and his parents were members of both the Black Panther Party and later the Sunni Muslim community. His mother was a union organizer, and a tenants' rights and housing advocate, and his father worked on Mayor David Dinkins first mayoral campaign.

Galvanized by the police murders of the several black people, including Eleanor Bumpers, Michael Stewart, and Michael Griffith, Williams became politically active as a teenager in an effort to end racially based and state-based violence and murder against people of African descent in New York. As a 14-year-old, he was formally initiated into the Kemetic priesthood by Amen Khafra Ndongo, High Priest and Founder of the Temple of the White and Gold Lotus, Shrine of Amen-Ra and received the name Aih Djehuti Herukhuti Khepera Ra Temi Seti Amen.

Williams holds a PhD. in human and organizational systems with a concentration in transformative learning for social justice and specializations in sexuality and cross-cultural studies of knowledge.

== Career ==
Williams is the author of Conjuring Black Funk: Culture, Sexuality and Spirituality, Vol. 1 and the co-editor with Robin Ochs of Recognize: the Voices of Bisexual Men.

Williams has worked as a human rights and social justice activist specifically within the decolonization movement focusing on intersectional politics. His activism has taken many forms over the years including as a co-founder and the inaugural co-chair of Global Youth Connect, an international human rights organization for youth. His work can be found in academic and trade publications such as Sexualities, Journal of Bisexuality, ARISE Magazine, and Ma-Ka Diasporic Juks: Contemporary Writings by Queers of African Descent. He is the co-editor with Loraine Hutchins of Sexuality, Religion and the Sacred: Bisexual, Pansexual and Polysexual Perspectives. A board member of the editorial board of the Journal of Bisexuality, he served as the co-editor of the journal's special double issue on spirituality, the Journal of Black Sexuality and Relationships.

Williams has received numerous fellowships including a National Institute of Mental Health-funded graduate research at the HIV Center for Clinical Behavioral Studies at Columbia University and the New York State Psychiatric Institute. He along with a cohort of bisexual leaders, activists and researchers were invited to the White House in 2013 for a community issues and public policy roundtable where he co-presented on the topic of HIV and bisexuals. And in 2015 Williams received the Brenda Howard Award, the first award by a major American LGBT organization to be named after an openly bisexual person.

Also in 2015, Williams was a Lambda Literary Foundation Playwriting Fellow, and a Thought Leader for the Association of Black Sexologists and Clinicians. He currently serves as a professor at Goddard College, an interdisciplinary studies college where he teaches progressive education with students interested in social movements, arts and cultural studies, sexuality studies, spirituality studies, social entrepreneurship and education.

== Works ==
- Conjuring Black Funk: Notes on Culture, Sexuality and Spirituality, Volume 1 (Vintage Entity Press, 2007.)
- Sexuality, Religion and the Sacred: Bisexual, Pansexual and Polysexual Perspectives (ed., with Loraine Hutchins. Routledge, 2012.)
- Recognize: The Voices of Bisexual Men—An Anthology (ed., with Robyn Ochs. Bisexual Resource Center, 2014.)
