= Evelyn Mantilla =

Puerto Rican politician

Member of the Connecticut House of Representatives from the 4th district
- In office February 1997 – January 2007
- Succeeded by: Kelvin Roldán

Personal details
- Born: February 16, 1963 (age 63) Caguas, Puerto Rico
- Party: Democratic
- Education: Manchester Community College (AS); St. Joseph's College (BBA)

Evelyn Mantilla (born February 16, 1963) is an American politician from Connecticut who served from 1997 to 2007 as a member of the Connecticut House of Representatives. Mantilla was born in Caguas, Puerto Rico, and moved to Hartford, Connecticut, in 1978. She has a A.S. degree in computer science from Manchester Community College (Connecticut) and bachelor's degree in management, magna cum laude, from the University of Saint Joseph (Connecticut). She was first elected to represent the predominantly Latino 4th district in a special election held in February 1997, and she served for a time as Deputy Majority Leader. She came out as America's first openly bisexual state official in 1997.

== Political career ==
Mantilla's first run for office was in 1993, when she campaigned for the Hartford City Council. She lost this election by 16 votes. In 1996, Mantilla took the position of legislative liaison for the Connecticut Permanent Commission on the Status of Women. Then, in September 1996, Mantilla began her second political campaign, running against the incumbent Eddie Garcia to be a state representative for Connecticut's district 4. She and her campaign staff, composing of 100 volunteers, faced death threats, threats of physical harm, and attempted arson to their headquarters. After a tumultuous campaign, Mantilla lost the 1996 election to Garcia. However, Garcia was later convicted of voter fraud, and Mantilla petitioned for a new election, which she won.

In February 1997, Mantilla was elected as a state representative for district 4 in the House of Representatives of the Connecticut General Assembly. She came out as the first bisexual U.S. state representative in June 1997 during an LGBT pride event in Hartford, Connecticut. Addressing the crowd, she declared, "I am a bisexual woman in love with a woman," and proposed to her partner, Babette.

Mantilla ran for re-election successfully in 1998, 2000, 2002, and 2004. During the election in 1998, she faced an anti-gay oppositional campaign by Pentecostal minister Gabriel Carreras. He ran as an independent candidate to challenge Mantilla, claiming that she was "promoting the homosexual lifestyle in our schools." Mantilla won re-election with 88% of the vote.

During her time as a legislator, Mantilla prioritized issues pertaining to lower socioeconomic areas. She also worked to push forward election reform as well as same-sex marriage legalization.

She chose not to run for re-election in 2006, and her term expired in January 2007. She was succeeded by Democrat Kelvin Roldán.

Evelyn is now Executive Director of ITNCentralCT, a nonprofit organization that helps seniors and people who have a visual disability remain independent by providing volunteer drivers. She also continues to run Mantilla Leadership Solutions, a private public affairs and political services firm.

== Other work ==
Mantilla has held leadership positions with the National Council for Community and Justice and the Hartford Sexual Assault Crisis Service. She has received awards from the Connecticut Institute for Community Development and the National Association of Social Workers, among others.

She worked as the communications manager for the city of Hartford from 2008 to 2012. She also worked as the principal of Mantilla Leadership Solutions, a political campaign consulting firm, and currently works as the managing director for Grossman Solutions, a public affairs firm.
