= Friends Journal =

Quaker magazine

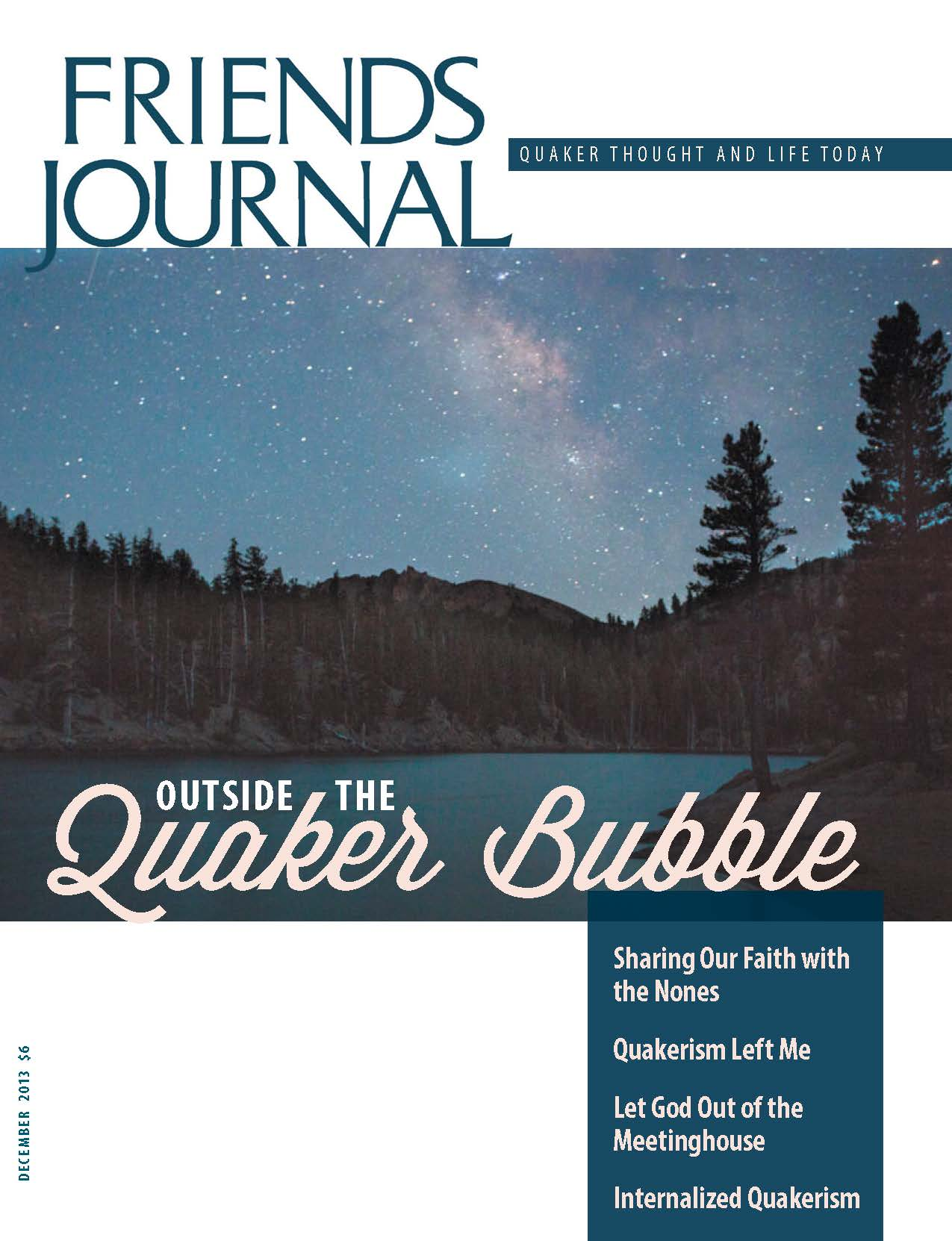
- Friends Journal from December 2013
- Categories: Quaker magazine
- Frequency: Monthly
- Circulation: 6,510
- First issue: October 13, 1827
- Company: Friends Publishing Corporation
- Country: United States
- Based in: Philadelphia
- Website: www.friendsjournal.org
- ISSN: 0016-1322

Friends Journal is a monthly Quaker magazine that combines first-person narrative, reportage, poetry, and news. Friends Journal began publishing in 1827 and 1844 with the founding of The Friend (Orthodox, 1827—1955) and The Friends Intelligencer (Hicksite, 1844—1955). In 1955 the magazines joined together as Friends Journal, coinciding with the reconciliation of Hicksite and Orthodox branches of Friends in Philadelphia. The united magazine was originally published weekly and then bi-weekly; it became a monthly periodical in 1988. The first editor-in-chief of the Friends Journal as such was William Hubben, from 1955—1963.

Friends Journal is an independent publication of Friends Publishing Corporation, based in Philadelphia, Pennsylvania. Its mission is "to communicate Quaker experience in order to connect and deepen spiritual lives." The magazine is a founding member of Quakers Uniting in Publications. It publishes poetry, news about Quaker affairs, letters, information about Quaker meetings, and book reviews.

The journal’s archives were digitized around 2012. In 2014, Friends Journal launched QuakerSpeak, a YouTube channel featuring interviews with friends on core questions of Quaker faith. In 2016, Friends Journal received the Best in Class award from the Association of Church Press. In 2018 Friends Journal relaunched Quaker.org as a general information website for the Religious Society of Friends.

The Friends Intelligencer, 1923
