= Gary North (journalist) =

American activist and journalist

Gary B. North, is an American writer and activist. He is a newspaper editor, former president of the Los Angeles Newspaper Guild/Southern California Media Guild (AFL-CIO), and a founder of BiNet USA as well as the Conflict Resolution Service and CredibilityWatch.org. In 1988, he published the first national bisexual newsletter, called Bisexuality: News, Views, and Networking. He was formerly the president of the bisexual civil rights organization BiNet USA and is now its treasurer.
