= Bisexual Resource Center =

US-based nonprofit organization

Bisexual Resource Center (BRC)
- Bisexual Resource Center (BRC) Logo
- Formation: 1985
- President: Bailey Merlin
- Website: biresource.org

The Bisexual Resource Center (BRC) is a 501(c)(3) non-profit educational organization headquartered in Boston, Massachusetts, that has served the bisexual community since 1985. Originally known as The East Coast Bisexual Network, it incorporated in 1989 as a 501(c)(3) nonprofit and changed its name to the Bisexual Resource Center in 1993.

Describing itself as one of the oldest nationally focused bisexual organizations in the U.S. the BRC's current president is Bailey Merlin It provides education about bisexual and progressive issues and support for bisexual people. The organization, the most active American bisexual advocacy and resource group, also sponsors bi-positive programming, holds a support group, promotes visibility at Pride events and provides speakers about bisexuality.

It has a "long-standing role as a clearinghouse for bisexual information," and has a lending library with approximately 200 books about bisexuality and some movies. In 1987, The East Coast Bisexual Network (as it was then known) established the first Bisexual History Archives with Robyn Ochs's initial collection; archivist Clare Morton hosted researchers. The 1987 East Coast Bisexual Network Conference inspired the founding of the Bay Area Bi+ & Pan Network, originally called the Bay Area Bisexual Network.

The BRC publishes the biannual Bisexual Resource Guide, a comprehensive listing of bisexual and bi-inclusive organizations, bi-related books and films, web sites, and academic articles. The first edition was published in the mid-1980s.

The BRC produces Getting Bi: Voices of Bisexuals Around the World, now in its second edition. The anthology is edited by Ochs and Sarah E. Rowley and has 220 entries from people from 42 countries. Topics include coming out, relationships, politics, community, and more. The book also addresses the intersection of bisexuality with race, class, ethnicity, gender identity, disability and national identity.

The BRC had its first float at the Boston LGBT Pride parade in 2010. In 2014, the BRC declared March of that year as the first "Bisexual Health Awareness Month", with the theme "Bi the Way, Our Health Matters Too!".

== See also ==
- Bisexual American history
- Bisexual community
- Biphobia
- Bisexual erasure
- Creating Change Conference
- BiNet USA
