= Bi Any Other Name =

1991 anthology

Bi Any Other Name: Bisexual People Speak Out
- Cover of the paperback edition of Bi Any Other Name: Bisexual People Speak Out
- Author: Loraine Hutchins and Lani Kaʻahumanu
- Language: English
- Subject: Bisexuality
- Publisher: Alyson Publications
- Publication date: 1991
- Publication place: United States
- ISBN: 1-55583-174-5

Bi Any Other Name: Bisexual People Speak Out, published by Riverdale Avenue Books, is an anthology edited by Loraine Hutchins and Lani Kaʻahumanu, and is one of the seminal books in the history of the modern bisexual rights movement. It holds a place that is in many ways comparable to that held by Betty Friedan's The Feminine Mystique in the feminist movement.

The book comprises fiction and nonfiction pieces, poetry and art created by a diverse group of over seventy bisexual people speaking about their lives.

This book helped spark at least ten other books (many by its own contributors), was named one of Lambda Book Report's Top 100 Queer Books of the 20th century, has been reprinted three times since 1991, has over 40,000 copies in circulation, and was translated and published in Taiwan in June 2007. It also frequently appears on numerous LGBT reading lists, from assistance in coming out to queer studies curriculum guides.

In 1992, despite requests from the bisexual community for a more appropriate and inclusive category, Bi Any Other Name: Bisexual People Speak Out was forced to compete (and lose) in the category "Lesbian Anthology" at the Lambda Literary Awards. Additionally, in 2005, Directed by Desire: Collected Poems, a posthumous collection of the bisexual Jamaican American writer June Jordan's work, had to compete (and win) in the category "Lesbian Poetry". Led by BiNet USA, and assisted by other bisexual organizations including the American Institute of Bisexuality, BiPOL, and Bialogue, the bisexual community launched a multi-year struggle that eventually culminated in 2006 with the addition of a Bisexual category at the Lambda Literary Awards.

A 25th anniversary edition of the book was released in 2015 during Bi Awareness Week.
