= Transcending Boundaries Conference =

Northeast American convention

- Status: Active
- Genre: Gender and sexuality
- Location: New England
- Country: United States
- Inaugurated: October 2001
- Founders: Lisa Jacobs; Alice Leibowitz; Vincent Cangiano
- Attendance: 315
- Organizer: Transcending Boundaries, Inc.
- Filing status: 501(c)(3)
- Website: transcendingboundaries.org

The Transcending Boundaries Conference (TBC) was a Northeast American convention for bisexual + other middle sexualities, genderqueer, transgender, intersex, polyamorous and other people who do fall outside strict binaries as well as their family, friends, and straight allies.

== History ==
The Transcending Boundaries conference developed from a regional conference co-organized by BiNet USA, a national organization for bisexuals in the United States. Throughout the 1990s, BiNet USA helped bisexual activists to organize local groups; they also sponsored regional conferences for bisexual people. The Transcending Boundaries Conference developed from a conference facilitated by BiNet USA to serve the U.S. states of Connecticut, New Jersey, and New York. This tri-state area conference took place in 2000. Attendees voted to host it in successive years independently of BiNet USA, and to host the next year's conference in New Haven, Connecticut.

The new organizing committee comprised three founding members: Lisa Jacobs (President), Alice Leibowitz (Treasurer), and Vincent Cangiano (Secretary), all of Connecticut. They expanded scope of the conference in two ways: First, it widened the geographical reach to include the entire Northeastern United States. Second, they endeavored to appeal to the interests of transgender and intersex people, in addition to the bisexual/non-monosexual community. They also retitled the conference to Transcending Boundaries both to reflect this policy, and to acknowledge that mainstream cultural conceptions of sex and gender often compartmentalize their varied expressions. The committee incorporated in 2001 as Transcending Boundaries, Inc., a Connecticut 501(c)(3) nonprofit organization.

== Conferences ==
Transcending Boundaries held five annual conferences between 2001 and 2006. In 2005 they collaborated with the Americas Conference on Bisexuality. They co-hosted the 2006 convention with the Northeastern United States division of PFLAG.

Transcending Boundaries hosted no conferences in 2007 and 2008, but resumed in 2009, which marked the first year that the conference officially added polyamorous people to its list of communities to serve. The scope of the conference later expanded to include such underrepresented groups as asexual, genderqueer, and "kinky" people.

| Number | Year | Date | City | State | Attendance | Notes |
|---|---|---|---|---|---|---|
| 1st | 2001 | October | New Haven | Connecticut | 200 | Co-sponsored by the LGBT Coop of Yale University. |
| 2nd | 2002 | October | New Britain | Connecticut | 125 | Co-sponsored by CCSU PRIDE of Central Connecticut State University. |
| 3rd | 2003 | October | Amherst | Massachusetts | 175 | Co-sponsored by the Pride Alliance of the University of Massachusetts Amherst. |
| 4th | 2005 | November | East Hartford | Connecticut | 150 | Held in conjunction with America's Conference on Bisexuality. Keynote speaker: Magdalen Hsu-Li |
| 5th | 2006 | October | Worcester | Massachusetts | 500 | Held in conjunction with the Northeast Regional PFLAG Conference. |
| 6th | 2009 | November | Worcester | Massachusetts | 200 | Keynote speaker: Tristan Taormino |
| 7th | 2010 | November | Worcester | Massachusetts | 265 | Keynote speaker: Lee Harrington |
| 8th | 2011 | November | Springfield | Massachusetts | 315 | Keynote speaker: Kate Bornstein |
| 9th | 2012 | October | Springfield | Massachusetts | | Keynote speaker: Ignacio Rivera |
| 10th | 2014 | April | Hartford | Connecticut | | Keynote speaker: Wintersong Tashlin |
| 11th | 2015 | November | Springfield | Massachusetts | | Keynote speaker: Faith Cheltenham of BiNet USA |

== See also ==
- Transgender people and the LGBT community
