= BiNet USA =

American nonprofit organization

- Bi/Net USA, The Bisexual Network of the USA Inc.
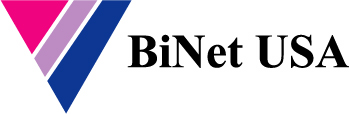
- Formation: 1990; 36 years ago
- Tax ID no.: 36-4005814
- Legal status: 501(c)(3) nonprofit organization
- Headquarters: Arlington, Virginia, U.S.
- President: Faith Cheltenham
- Revenue: 174,000 (2020)
- Formerly called: North American Bisexual Network

BiNet USA (officially Bi/Net USA, The Bisexual Network of the USA Inc.) was an American national nonprofit bisexual community whose mission was to "facilitate the development of a cohesive network of bisexual communities, promote bisexual visibility, and collect and distribute educational information regarding bisexuality. Until 2020, BiNet USA provided a national network for bisexual organizations and individuals across the United States, and encouraged participation and organizing on local and national levels." They claimed to be the oldest national bisexuality organization in the United States. In 2020, all of the content on BiNet USA's website was replaced with a statement that the BiNet USA president, Faith Cheltenham, now identified as Christian conservative and was walking away from progressive politics entirely.

== Programs and campaigns ==
Some of the work the organization has been involved in includes the following.

=== Campaigns ===
- 1993: Played a key role in the successful national campaign to include "Bi" in the March on Washington for Gay, Lesbian and Bi Equal Rights and Liberation.
- 1998: Organizes an Ally Campaign, educating and holding ally organizations accountable for their actions.
- After the 1991 bisexual anthology Bi Any Other Name: Bisexual People Speak Out was forced to compete in the Lambda Literary Awards under the category "Lesbian Anthology", and Directed by Desire: Collected Poems, a posthumous collection of the bisexual poet June Jordan's work, had to compete (and won) in the category "Lesbian Poetry", BiNet USA led the bisexual community in a multi year campaign eventually resulting in the addition of a Bisexual category, starting with the 2006 Awards.
- 2008: Under the slogan "Vote Against Hate in 2008", partnered with Rock the Vote to successfully reach out to and register people from its constituent communities and encourage participation in the American electoral process.

=== Policy initiatives ===
- Bisexual Youth Initiative (1995): a survey was developed and sent out to organizations nationwide serving LGBTQ youth. The survey report was published and sent to agencies, offering assistance in improving services.
- Bisexual Rural Initiative (1996): Initiative to reach out and determine specific needs of bisexuals in rural areas.
- Bisexual Health Initiative (2007): participated in the development of the report Bisexual health: An introduction and model practices for HIV/STI prevention programming in conjunction with the National Gay and Lesbian Task Force and Fenway Community Health, including the Bisexual Health Timeline.

=== Conferences (partial list) ===
- with the Bisexual Resource Center and the Washington, DC–based Alliance of Multicultural Bisexuals co-sponsor the largest US bisexual conference to date with over 600 people in attendance. (1993)
- Hosts the First National Institute on Bisexuality and HIV/AIDS (1998)
- Co-sponsor of the Transcending Boundaries Conference (2005) (2006)
- With the Lambda Literary Foundation and New York City's Lesbian, Gay, Bisexual and Transgender Community Services Center co-sponsor of the "Big Bi Book Weekend" including "Bi Lines: A Celebration of Bisexual Writing in Reading, Music and Culture" a fund-raising event to benefit the Bi Writers Association (2007)
- With the Bisexual Foundation et al. co-sponsor of the International Conference on Bisexuality (1994) (1998) (2004) (2006) when held in the United States. A member of the standing committee that is currently planning the 10th ICB to be held on the campus of the University of Rhode Island in July 2008.

== History and structure ==
Tracing its roots back to the 1987 Second National March on Washington for Lesbian and Gay Rights, the group further coalesced in 1990 when BiPol convened the first National Bisexual Conference in San Francisco. At that time a conference track was dedicated to creating a national organization. This first conference was attended by over 450 people from 20 states and 5 countries, and the mayor of San Francisco sent a proclamation "commending the bisexual rights community for its leadership in the cause of social justice", and declaring June 23, 1990, Bisexual Pride Day.

The following summer, the North American Bisexual Network was formalized in Seattle. Later its name would change to BiNet USA which coincided with the group becoming a nonprofit organization.

In its first decade, BiNet USA worked on a variety of campaigns, national policy initiatives and hosted/co-hosted a number conferences. Moving into its second decade, BiNet USA, like many other U.S. charitable organizations, was hit hard when funding dried up in the wake of the 9/11 attacks on the US mainland in September 2001. It was forced to lay off its paid staff and roll back its plans for new office space.

Faced with these new economic and logistical realities, BiNet USA begins to focus more of its efforts on Internet activism using the Internet as an organizing tool for community growth. It uses an "800" phone number, website, MySpace page, Facebook Group, and ListServ, established using Yahoo Groups, to facilitate communication between various and disparate bisexual, pansexual and fluid communities and activists nationwide.

In 2005, after a period of progress marked by growing acceptance in both the larger LGBT and straight communities, the bisexual community suddenly came under a new attack promulgated by the publication of a study entitled "Sexual Arousal Patterns of Bisexual Men" by the controversial researcher J. Michael Bailey. This study allegedly "proved" that bisexual men did not exist. With little critical examination, various media celebrities and outlets jumped on the bandwagon and claimed to have "solved" the "problem of bisexuality" by declaring it to be non-existent, at least in men.

Working with other established LGBT institutions such as the National Gay and Lesbian Task Force GLAAD, the Bisexual Resource Center as well as newer ones such as Bialogue, BiNet USA moved to co-ordinate a national response to this threat to the well-being of the bisexual community. It has now revitalized and updated its 'Rapid-Response Spokesperson Team' and now monitors and responds quickly to media portrayals of the bisexual community.

Starting in 2008 under the leadership of its then president Wendy Curry, who is herself a software engineer, BiNet USA greatly expanded its use of Internet activism taking advantage of the flowering of a variety of social networking venues including LiveJournal, MySpace and Facebook.

In September 2009, BiNet USA expanded its board of directors, making Gary B. North the new president.

In October 2009, BiNet USA endorsed the National Equality March and helped organize a contingent of several bisexual groups that participated in the march.

In 2014, BiNet USA declared the seven days surrounding Celebrate Bisexuality Day to be Bi Awareness Week, also called Bisexual Awareness Week. The week begins the Sunday before Celebrate Bisexuality Day.

=== Structure ===
BiNet USA was incorporated as a nonprofit organization in Florida on February 14, 1994. It has 501(c)(3) status. Its headquarters are in Arlington, Virginia. Decision-making is by consensus by the board of directors with the advice and consent of the members of the Standing Committees and the various Regional Representatives.

=== Leadership ===
BiNet USA was overseen by a board of directors. The members of the board of directors at the time of BiNet USA's re-branding from a progressive bisexual advocacy organization to a conservative nonprofit were as follows.

- Faith Cheltenham, President
- Juba Kalamka, Vice President
- Denise Penn, Secretary
- Lynnette McFadzen, Treasurer, Emeritus

=== Claims of copyright of bisexual pride flag ===
Bisexual pride flag, which is in the public domain

On April 28, 2020, BiNet USA president Faith Cheltenham claimed via the organization's Twitter account that they own sole copyright to the bisexual pride flag, stating that they would be restricting the flag's use without direct authorization. The tweets subsequently received many critical responses, including questioning the validity of a copyright claim, as previous documentation had established the flag as being within the public domain. The flag had been designed in 1998 by Michael Page in the course of volunteer work for BiNet USA. Their original Twitter account was deactivated on April 29, 2020, and a new account was made and pointed to by Cheltenham.

On April 29, 2020, Dr. Lauren Beach gave a statement on her Twitter in which she stated that, as a board member, she was not consulted about BiNet USA's decision and that she does not agree with it. A day later, she confirmed that the board had an emergency meeting on April 30, 2020, and that a statement is to be released soon. On May 1, Faith Cheltenham released a statement prepared by the BiNet USA's board onto the official blog page, as well as tweeting it from the, now reactivated, official Twitter account. Also on May 1, Beach stated she had resigned from the board. Two days later, Cheltenham posted a statement that she had asked Juba Kalamka to be president of BiNet and that he would do so as of January 21, 2021. The same day, BiNet USA posted a statement that began "As of May 2020, BiNet USA CEASES AND DESISTS OF ALL USE OF THE BISEXUAL PRIDE FLAG".

On May 25, 2020, BiNet USA's Twitter reversed its position, stating "We strongly reject and refute any assertion that BiNet USA claimed, or ever claimed the bisexual pride flag."

In November 2020, Cheltenham announced that she would retain control of the organization and identified as a conservative. She stated that she "and all bi content" would no longer be on mainstream social media.

== See also ==
- Bisexual American history
- Bisexual community
- Biphobia
- Bisexual erasure
- Creating Change Conference
- Bisexual Resource Center
