= Omnisexuality =

Sexual orientation attracted to all genders with gender having a factor

- Classification: Sexual identity
- Parent category: Plurisexuality

Other terms
- Associated terms: Bisexuality; Pansexuality

Flag
- Omnisexual flag
- Flag name: Omnisexual flag
- Creation: 2015
- Designer: Pastelmemer
- Meaning: The shades of pink, blue, and purple symbolize attraction to femininity and women, masculinity and men, and all other genders, respectively.

Omnisexuality is a sexual orientation where someone is attracted to all genders with gender having a factor in attraction. Although some may use it as a synonym for pansexuality, others see the two identities as distinct from one another.

== Etymology and definition ==
The term "omnisexual" is derived from the Latin prefix omni-, meaning 'all' or 'universally', and sexuality. Omnisexuality is romantic or sexual attraction toward people of any sexual orientation or gender identity. Some may use omnisexuality and pansexuality as synonyms, and others use it as a different term meaning attraction to all genders without the gender blindness of pansexuality.

A 2025 article by Olivia Goldhill in Quartz described omnisexuals as "actively attracted to all genders" rather than being "oblivious" to gender.

Queerty also distinguished between polysexuality and omnisexuality, saying those who identity with the former are "attracted to multiple genders" while those who identify with the latter "experience attraction towards all genders", asserting that polysexuality is an "umbrella term that covers omnisexuality."

To deal with issues related to transphobia and the gender binary, some individuals have taken on terms such as pansexual, omnisexual, or polysexual in place of the term bisexual, with the American Institute of Bisexuality asserting, in 2014, that these terms "describe a person with homosexual and heterosexual attractions, and therefore people with these labels are also bisexual". In 2017, during Bisexual Awareness Week, GLAAD stated that some who are "attracted to people of any gender" identify with words such as omnisexual, and falls under the bisexual+ umbrella. The Bi Women Quarterly uses the same term "bisexual+" for their publication, saying they feature "the voices of women with bi+ sexualities (i.e., bi, pan, fluid, and other non-binary sexualities)."

Other scholars, and researchers, placed omnisexual under the definition of bisexual, stating that it includes "people attracted to more than one sex and/or gender," situated under the "bisexual+ umbrella", plurisexuality, or a "non-monosexual identity." Scholars Christopher K. Belous and Melissa L. Bauman noted, in 2017, that due to the fact that pansexuality has no uniform definition, some confuse or combine it with omnisexuality.

== Demographics ==
A study of participants in Ontario, Canada, in 2016, found that participants who self-identified as omnisexual, or other related identities such as bisexual or pansexual, were at a higher risk for negative impacts to a person's behavior, or mental health, possibly leading to substance abuse. In 2017, scholars Christopher K. Belous and Melissa L. Bauman, quoted a participant who said that among famous Millennials, the "new enlightened identity" is either to be sexually fluid, omnisexual, and pansexual, saying it isn't "quite the same" as being bisexual and "spawned by a cultural shift towards tolerance and diverse experiences."

A 2022 study by Wilson Y. Lee and J. Nicholson Hobbs of The Trevor Project, examined answers from 33,993 LGBTQ people ages 13 to 24 Gen Z individuals in the United States. They noted the importance of labels like omnisexual, stating that the label was a more important label for younger participants than for older participants. Scholars also examined gender and sexual identities of young adults, including those who identified as omnisexual, Other scholars stated that for autistic adults who were omnisexual, and other sexual orientations, their autistic traits created issues for their identifications.

In 2023, three scholars said that there were "higher rates of negative coping behaviors" among omnisexual, pansexual, and bisexual adults than heterosexual and cisgender adults when it came to the COVID-19 pandemic, with behaviors including "greater odds of drinking alcohol."

== Flag ==
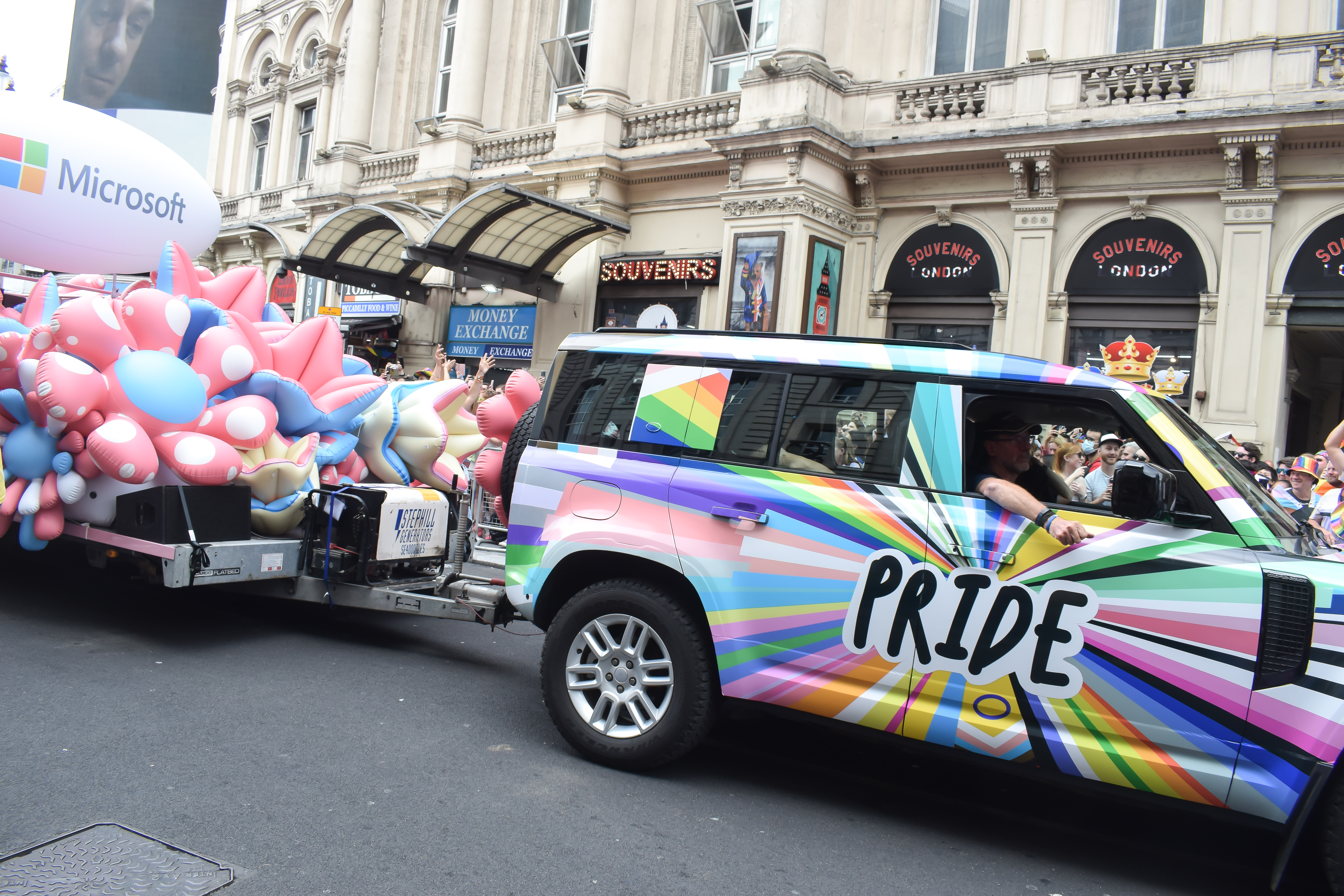
Flag depicted at 2022 London Pride

The omnisexual pride flag was designed by Tumblr user Pastelmemer in 2015. The flag consists of five horizontal stripes. The colors represent the wide spectrum of sexual attraction, with the pink and blue shades symbolizing attraction to femininity and women, and masculinity and men, respectively. The dark purple stripe in the middle represents attraction to all other genders that are outside of the gender binary.

== Popular culture and media depictions ==
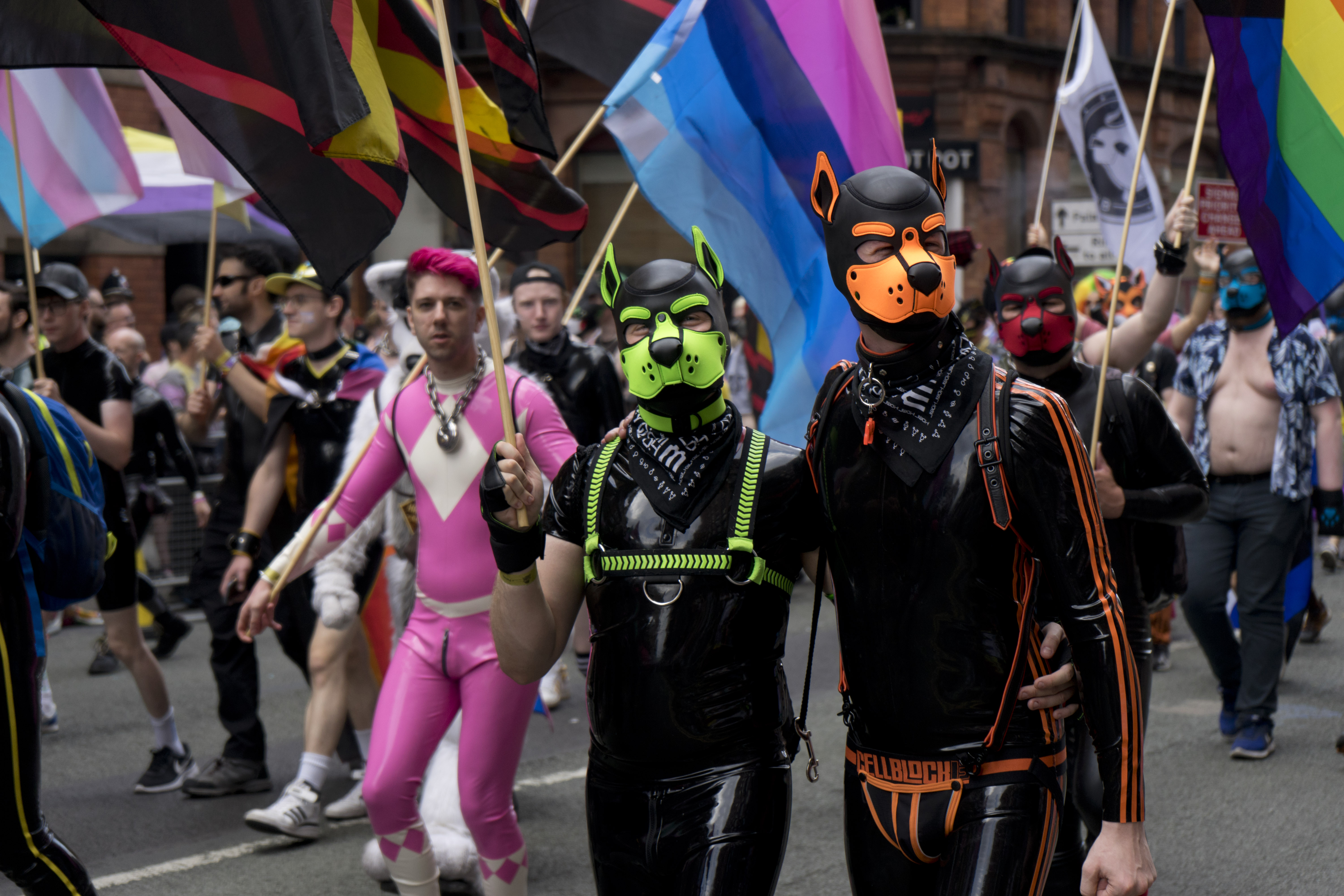
Pride flag at 2022 Manchester Pride

Some characters have appeared in fiction which have identified as omnisexual. Roger, one of the protagonists in American Dad!, is shown to have interest in both men and women and has been referred to as omnisexual. Elim Garak, a character in Star Trek: Deep Space Nine, was described by his actor, Andrew J. Robinson, as omnisexual while others interpreted the character as gay or bisexual. Due to the scrutiny from viewers and writers not wanting to explore that aspect of the character, he removed this trait from the character in later portrayals.

Charb's comic strip, Maurice et Patapon featured Maurice, a dog described by the newspaper Libération as leftist, pacifist, outgoing, and omnisexual, and a cat, Patapon, who is conservative, violent, asexual, and perverse. In the series Hannibal, Hannibal Lecter is omnisexual, according to series creator Bryan Fuller, and is in love with Will Graham.

The Harkness Test, which is set of informal criteria originating in Internet fan communities to determine whether it would be ethically permissible to engage in sexual intercourse with a fictional non-human character, is named after Captain Jack Harkness, a fictional character from the television series Doctor Who and the spin-off Torchwood, who is canonically omnisexual. With some saying that labels "pansexual" and "omnisexual" are applied to the character, and writer Steven Moffat suggests that questions of sexual orientation do not even enter into Jack's mind, John Barrowman, in an interview with the Chicago Tribune, asserted that Harkness was bisexual, but in the show's world he is called omnisexual because characters "also have sex with aliens who take human form, and sex with male-male, women-women, all sorts of combinations." The term is also used once, in-universe, in the novel The House that Jack Built, when Ianto comments to a woman's remark about Jack, "He prefers the term 'omnisexual'."

Some entertainers have identified as omnisexual. For instance, Kesha called herself omnisexual rather than pansexual, musician Nesey Gallons describes herself as asexual and omnisexual, and Little Richard once told Charles White, in 1984, he was omnisexual. Singer Sophie B. Hawkins stated, in an interview with Howard Stern, that she identified as omnisexual, and denied rumors she had dated Martina Navratilova and Jodie Foster, saying, "I've never met any of the women I'm supposed to have had affairs with." James Rado, the romantic partner of Gerome Ragni, an American actor, singer, and songwriter, best known as one of the stars and co-writers of the 1967 musical Hair, told The Advocate in a 2008 interview that he was omnisexual. In 2006, American actress, producer, director, and aerialist Dreya Weber told AfterEllen that she was omnisexual.

The word omnisexual, later adapted to onissexual, appears mentioned in a Brazilian Portuguese-language text written by Machado de Assis.
