= BiCon =

A BiCon is a bisexual community gathering, it stands for either 'Bisexual Convention' or 'Bisexual Conference' or 'Bisexual Convention/Conference'.

- BiCon (UK)
- BECAUSE (Conference)
- International Conference on Bisexuality

== See also ==
- Bicon, a bisexual icon
