= Celebrate Bisexuality Day =

Annual holiday observed on September 23

- Bisexual pride flag
- Official name: Celebrate Bisexuality Day
- Also called: Bisexual Pride Day, Bi Visibility Day, CBD, Bisexual Pride and Bi Visibility Day, and Bisexuality+ Day
- Observed by: Bisexual people along with their families, friends, allies and supporters
- Type: Cultural
- Observances: Teach-ins, poetry reading, concerts, festivals, parties, picnics
- Date: September 23
- Next time: September 23, 2027
- Frequency: Annual
- First time: 1999
- Related to: Bisexual Awareness Week, LGBTQ pride

Celebrate Bisexuality Day (sometimes abbreviated as CBD and also called Bisexual Pride Day, Bi Visibility Day, Bisexual Pride and Bi Visibility Day, and Bisexuality+ Day) is observed annually on September 23 to recognize and celebrate bisexual people, the bisexual community, and the history of bisexuality.

== History ==
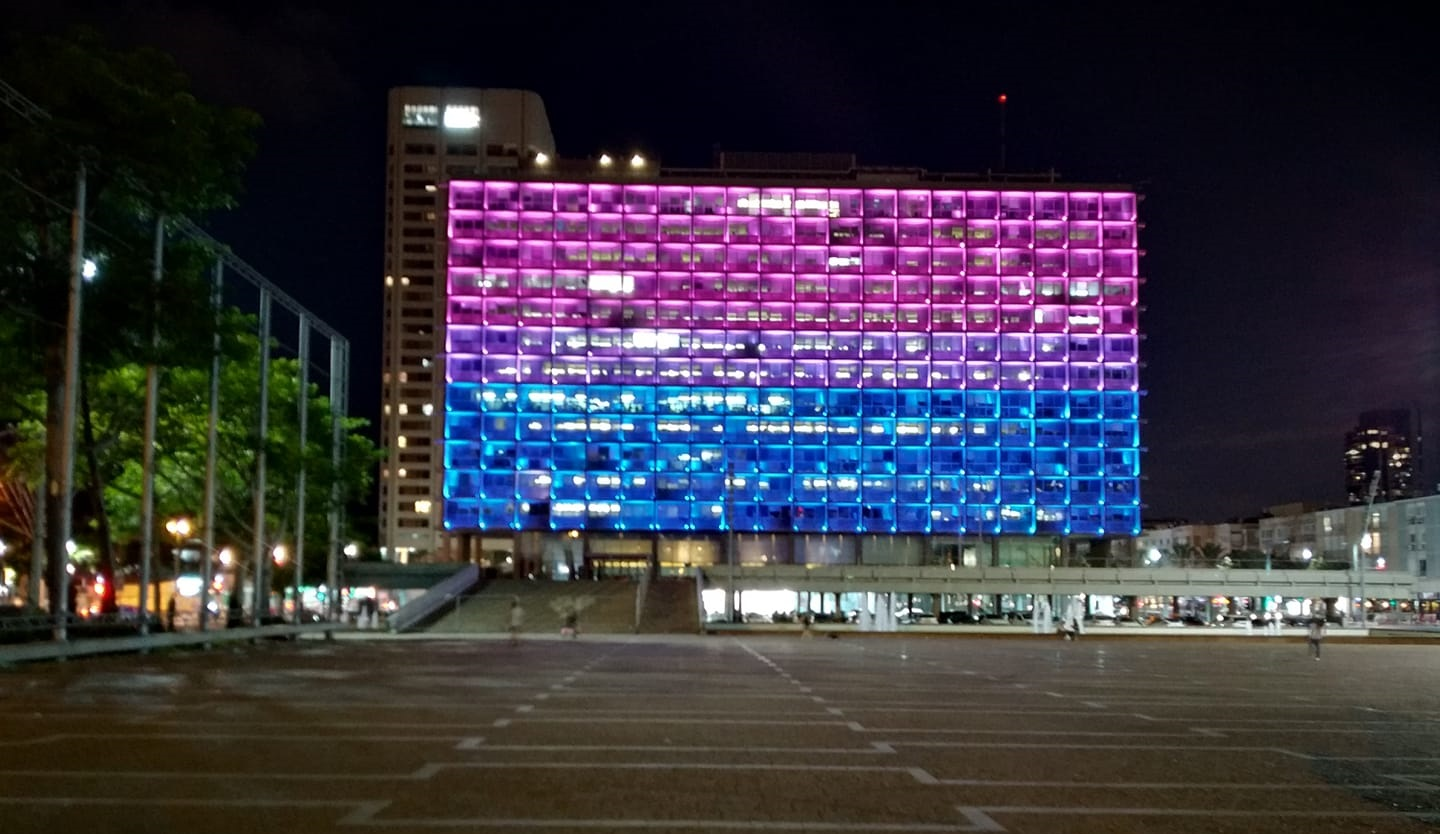
Tel Aviv-Yafo City Hall lighted with the colors of the bisexual flag on the bisexual visibility day, September 23, 2019

A precursor to the first official observance came when the oldest national bisexuality organization in the United States, BiNet USA, was founded in 1990. It was originally called the North American Multicultural Bisexual Network (NAMBN) and had its first meeting at the first National Bisexual Conference in America.

This first conference was held in San Francisco in 1990 and sponsored by BiPOL. More than 450 people attended from 20 states and five countries, and the mayor of San Francisco issued a proclamation "commending the bisexual rights community for its leadership in the cause of social justice" and declaring June 23, 1990, as Bisexual Pride Day.

First officially observed in 1999 at the International Lesbian and Gay Association Conference in Johannesburg, South Africa, Celebrate Bisexuality Day is the brainchild of three bisexual rights activists: Wendy Curry of Maine, Michael Page of Florida, and Gigi Raven Wilbur of Texas. Wilbur said:

Ever since the Stonewall rebellion, the gay and lesbian community has grown in strength and visibility. The bisexual community also has grown in strength but in many ways we are still invisible. Gibson said "I too have been conditioned by society to automatically label a couple walking hand in hand as either straight or gay, depending upon the perceived gender of each person."

This celebration of bisexuality in particular, as opposed to general LGBT events, was conceived as a response to the prejudice and marginalization of bisexual people by some in both the straight and greater LGBT communities. Wendy Curry said:

"We were sitting around at one of the annual bi conventions, venting and someone, I think it was Gigi said we should have a party. We all loved the great bisexual, Freddie Mercury. His birthday was in September, so why not Sept? We wanted a weekend day to ensure the most people would do something. Gigi's birthday was Sept 23rd. It fell on a weekend day, so poof! We had a day."

On September 18, 2012, Berkeley, California, became what is thought to be the first city in the U.S. to officially proclaim a day recognizing bisexuals. The Berkeley City Council unanimously and without discussion declared September 23 as Bisexual Pride and Bi Visibility Day.

In 2013, on Celebrate Bisexuality Day, the White House held a closed-door meeting with almost 30 bisexual advocates so they could meet with government officials and discuss issues of specific importance to the bisexual community; this was the first bi-specific event ever hosted by any White House.

On September 23, 2013, in the UK, government minister for women and equalities Jo Swinson MP issued a statement saying in part, "I welcome Bi Visibility Day which helps to raise awareness of the issues that bisexual people can face and provides an opportunity to celebrate diversity and focus on the B in LGB&T."

In 2021, Pennsylvania governor Tom Wolf became the first governor in the United States to issue a statement recognizing Bisexual Pride Day.

Many individuals and organizations, including GLAAD, currently refer to this holiday as Bisexuality+ Day, with the inclusion of the "+" sign intended to include the broader bi+ community of people who prefer to use terms to describe their sexual orientation such as pansexual, polysexual, omnisexual, fluid, or queer.

In 2022, Brisa Bracchi of the Municipal Chamber of Natal passed legislation formally recognising Celebrate Bisexuality Day in the city of Natal in northeastern Brazil.

== Bisexual+ Awareness Week ==
In 2014, BiNet USA declared the days surrounding Celebrate Bisexuality Day to be Bi Awareness Week, also called Bisexual+ Awareness Week. The week begins on September 16, culminating on Celebrate Bisexuality Day.

According to co-founding organization GLAAD, the goals of Bisexual+ Awareness Week include accelerating acceptance of the bisexual+ community, drawing attention to the experiences of this community, and celebrating the resiliency of the community. Both allies and bisexual+ individuals are encouraged to spend the week learning about the "history, culture, community, and current policy priorities of bi+ communities". Bisexual+ Awareness Week can also potentially be an important opportunity for bisexual+ individuals to help fight feelings of isolation, create more visibility for others who may be exploring their sexuality, meet other bisexual+ people, and become an integral member of the bisexual+ community by coming out or sharing their personal experiences.

== See also ==
- List of LGBTQ awareness periods
