= Bisexual community =

Community of bisexual, pansexual, and sexually fluid people

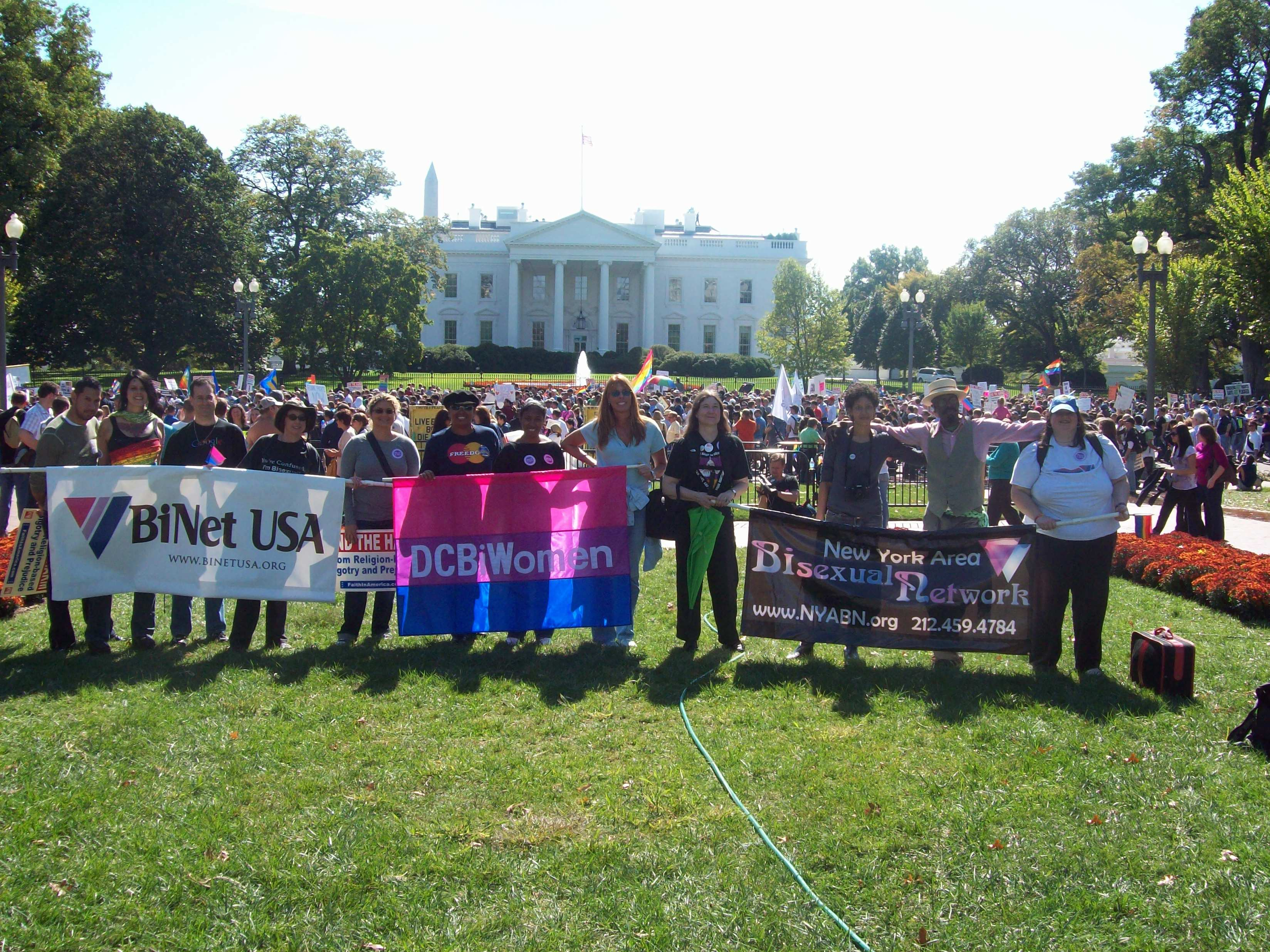
Some bisexual, fluid, pansexual and queer-identified contingents display their banners at the 2009 National Equality March

The bisexual community, also known as the bi+, b+, m-spec, bisexual/pansexual, bi/pan/fluid community, or bisexual umbrella, includes members of the LGBTQ community who have shared experiences of plurisexuality, defined as having attraction to more than one gender, as opposed to hetero- or homosexual people who only have attraction to one gender.

== Defining the community ==
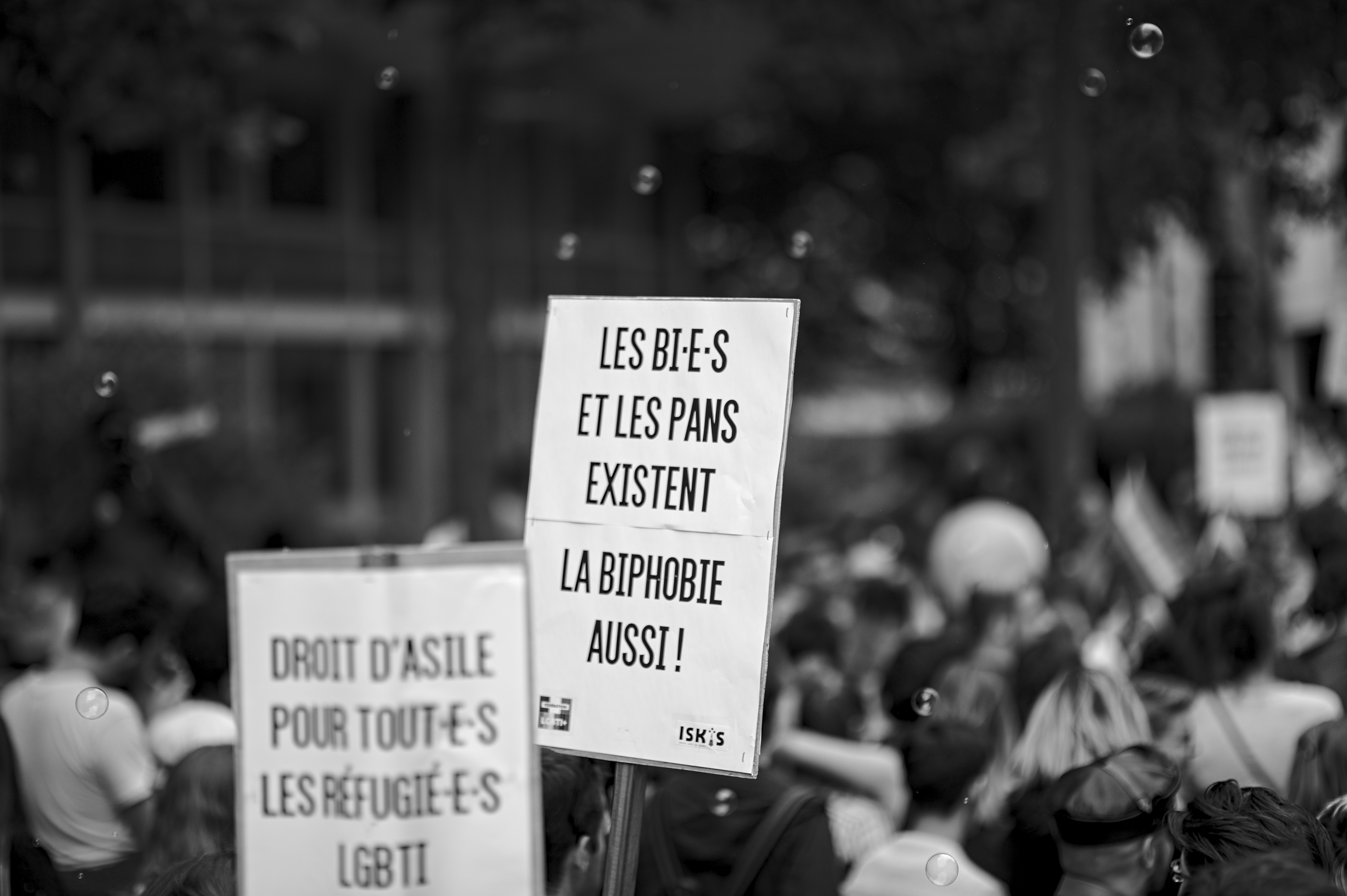
Sign saying "Bi and Pan People Exist Biphobia Too" 2018 Rennes Pride March, Rennes, France

The bisexual community, bi+ or, m-spec (meaning 'multisexual spectrum') is a broad umbrella and its members may identify variously as: bisexual, pansexual, omnisexual, biromantic, polysexual, or sexually fluid.

Bisexual people are less likely than their lesbian and gay counterparts to be out of the closet. As a result, there is a lot of variation among the bisexual community in how important bisexual people find bisexuality or LGBTQ identity to their sense of self. Bisexual people may have social networks that are heavily concentrated inside the wider LGBTQ community; whether or not they participate in broader LGBTQ culture, bisexual people may also participate in bisexual-specific communities.

== History ==
One of the first public acknowledgements of the bisexual community was initiated by bisexual activist Stephen Donaldson, when in 1972, his Quaker group published a statement of support in The Advocate of the bisexual community. Another important figure in the early bisexual movement is Brenda Howard.

Bisexual groups began forming in the 1980s in several cities around the United States, particularly on the coasts.

== Issues ==
People who identify as bisexual can receive specifically directed hatred and distrust (biphobia), stereotyping, and denial (bisexual erasure) from people of all sexual orientations, even within the LGBT community.

There are many prevalent stereotypes that wider society holds to be true about bisexuals such as they are unsure of their feelings or going through a "phase" and will or should "decide" or "discover" which sex they are attracted to. On the other hand, there is also increasing support, inclusion, and visibility of bisexuals in the LGBTQ community.

A series of groups have been working together and focusing on issues important to the bisexual community such as biphobia, dating, coming out, bisexual's visibility in the news and entertainment, and bisexual erasure. These groups are queer-identified and closely allied with the gay, lesbian, and transgender communities, but their main focus is the bisexual community.

There has also been a movement to combat biphobia and myths about bisexuals. The bisexual community (especially women) can suffer from invisibility since it does not have its own established visual culture like much of lesbian and gay culture.

== Equality campaigns and pride celebrations ==
September 23 is Celebrate Bisexuality Day. The week beginning on the Sunday before Celebrate Bisexuality Day is Bisexual Awareness Week.

The bisexual community comes together with the lesbian, gay, and transgender communities for bigger LGBTQ events such as LGBTQ pride parades, civil rights marches and advocacy, conferences, and other nationwide causes where the interests of the communities intersect. Often, conferences have separate seminars on bisexual and transgender topics, and several LGBTQ pride parades now include special bisexual sections as well.

The National Equality March as a national political rally that occurred on October 11, 2009, in Washington, D.C. - the first national march in the capital for LGBTQ rights since the 2000 Millennium March. It called for equal protection for lesbian, gay, bisexual, and transgender people in all matters governed by civil law in all states and districts. There was a specific bisexual, pansexual and queer-identified contingent that was organized to be a part of the march. Several bisexual, pansexual and queer-identified groups including BiNet USA, New York Area Bisexual Network, DC Bi Women and BiMA DC, came together and marched, showing bisexual, pansexual and queer solidarity. There were four out bisexual speakers at the National Equality March rally: Michael Huffington, Lady Gaga, Chloe Noble, and Penelope Williams.

In October 2009, LGBTQ activist Amy Andre was appointed as executive director of the San Francisco Pride Celebration Committee, making her San Francisco Pride's first bisexual woman of color executive director.

== Community projects ==
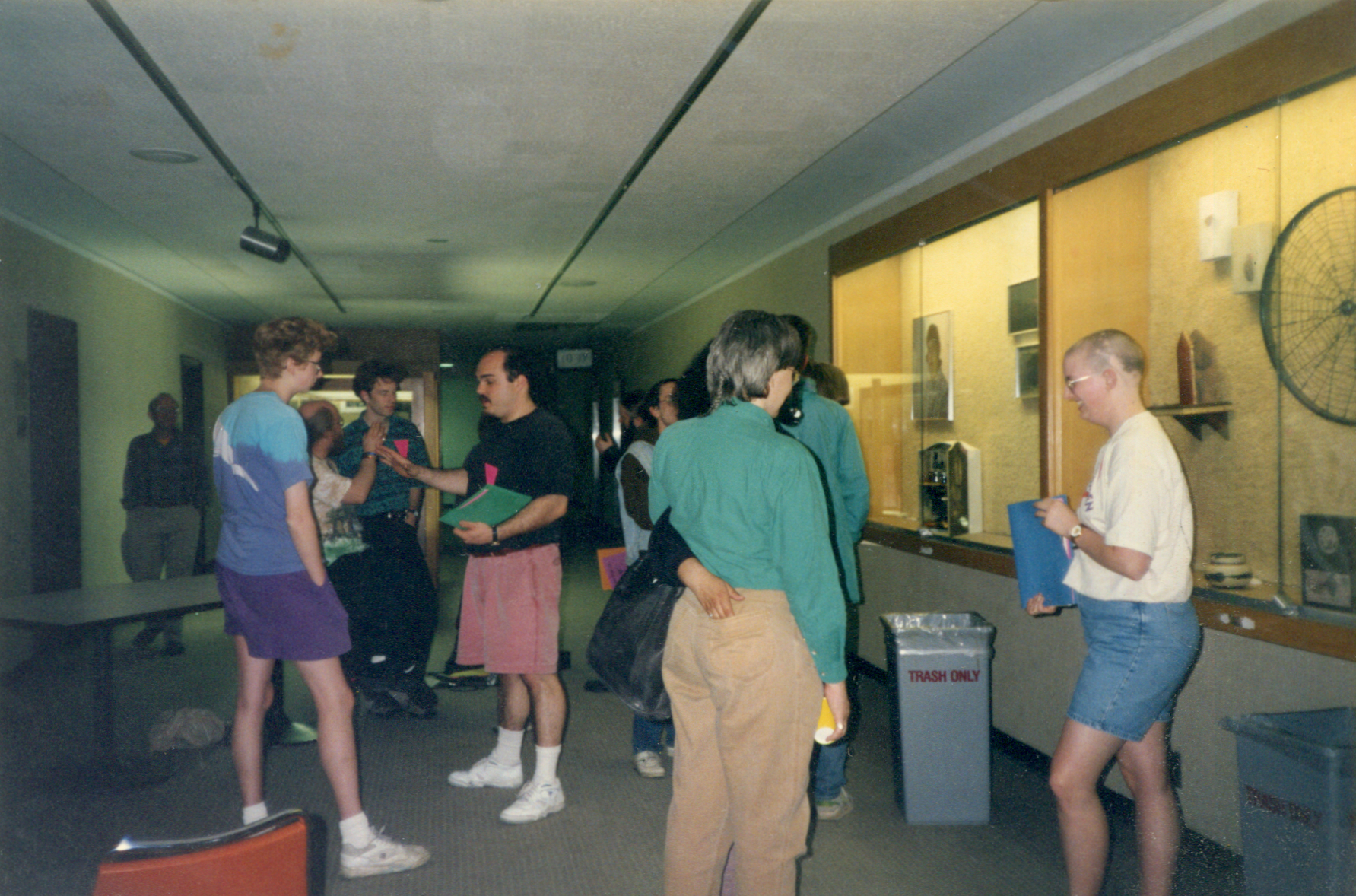
Between sessions at the BECAUSE Conference, St. Paul, Minnesota, 1994

The bisexual community has bi-specific events and conferences, publications, websites and organizations.

=== Conferences ===
There are several conferences and conventions for bi+ people. These include the International Conference on Bisexuality, BiCon (UK), and BECAUSE (Conference) in the United States. Several of these have produced offshoot research conferences on bisexuality, among them BiReCon and EuroBiReCon in the UK, Bi+ World Meetup in the Netherlands, and BiReConUSA in the United States.

=== Publications ===
- Bi Women Quarterly - founded by bisexual activist Robyn Ochs.
- Bi Community News

==== Books about bisexuality ====
- Bi Any Other Name
- Getting Bi

=== Websites and organizations ===
- BiNet USA
- Bi.org
- Bi Social Network
- Bisexual Resource Center
- Bi Writers Association
- GoBi.nl

== Notable bisexual figures ==
Politicians Micah Kellner, and Katie Hill.

== See also ==
- Biphobia
- Biromantic
- Bisexual erasure
- Bisexuality
- Bisexuality in the United States
- Bisexual lighting
- History of bisexuality
- LGBTQ culture § Bisexual culture
- List of media portrayals of bisexuality
- Omnisexuality
- Pansexuality
- Plurisexuality
- Polysexuality
- Sexual fluidity
