= Bi Women Quarterly =

- Cover of the Summer 2017 issue
- Editor: Robyn Ochs
- Founded: September 1983
- Country: United States
- Based in: Boston
- Language: English

Bi Women Quarterly (BWQ) is a global grassroots publication that works in affiliation with the Boston Bisexual Women's Network in Boston, Massachusetts. Started in September 1983, it is the oldest running publication for bisexual women.

The publication seeks to amplify the voices of women who fall under the bisexual+ umbrella. Bi Women Quarterly uses the term bisexual+, coined by GLAAD, in order to encompass identities including but not limited to bisexual, pansexual, polysexual, omnisexual, fluid, and queer. BWQ's definition of womanhood includes transgender women, nonbinary/genderqueer individuals, cisgender women, and other woman-aligned identities.

Bisexual activist Robyn Ochs is the publication's editor.

== Publication history ==
Bi Women Quarterly started as the newsletter of the Boston Bisexual Women's Network; it is now a standalone publication. It is published four times each year and accepts a variety of submission types including fiction writing, nonfiction writing, poetry, news articles, book reviews, letters to the editor, and visual art. The publication is "staffed entirely by volunteers," and is stationed in Jamaica Plain, a neighborhood in the city of Boston.

=== Archives ===
Current editor Robyn Ochs donated "the only complete collection" of BWQ to Harvard University's Schlesinger Library in order to ensure the preservation and digitization of the publication. This digitized collection holds every iteration of BWQ from 1983 to 2010 both in print and in an online format.

Earlier publications of BWQ often include sections with redacted names and contact information, in order to protect the privacy of individuals. Thus, many of the publication's original contributors' and editors' names are not known. This group of individuals, originally eight in number, connected through a meeting on bisexuality conducted at the Cambridge Women's Center. With an age range from 23 to 36 years old, these women labeled themselves the BiVocals.

Members of the BiVocals teamed up with other bisexual, lesbian, and women's groups, in order to create the Boston Bisexual Women's Network. The purpose of this network was to synthesize the already existing resources for bisexual women in the area. The BBWN as an organization also helped to cultivate support groups, consciousness-raising meetings, educational resources, and resources for political action.

== Publication and content ==
Each issue of Bi Women Quarterly is curated from a selection of submissions based on previously released prompts. These prompts serve as points of inspiration for writers, artists, and creatives that identify as women under the bisexual+ umbrella. Examples of prompts include coming out stories, bisexuality and disability, mental health, and visibility. Many of these prompts serve as a call to action for bisexual+ women from a variety of backgrounds, in order to display the diverse and intersectional experiences and opinions that exist within the bisexual+ community.

=== Advice Column ===
From 2017-2020, Bi Women Quarterly included an advice column authored by a woman under the pseudonym of A. Rose Bi. She is a self-described reader of BWQ, with experience in LGBTQ+ specialization for fields such as Cognitive Science, sexual assault advocacy, feminism, and media representation.

Prior to the introduction of A. Rose Bi, author Tiggy Upland ran a column entitled Ask Tiggy.

=== Calendar ===
At the end of each issue, BWQ includes a calendar section. This section is dedicated to advertising upcoming events in the Metro-Boston area that are relevant to the experiences of bisexual+ women. Included in this section are the meeting times for a number of monthly groups, including those created for bisexual+ or questioning individuals who are in heterosexual relationships, bisexual+ youth, and bisexual+ individuals in general. Also included in this section are dates for different pride events, such as Boston Pride, the Boston Dyke March, and AIDS Walk Boston.

=== News Briefs ===
The semi-regular News Briefs section of BWQ is currently written by Robyn Ochs. It is a space dedicated to sharing news related to the bisexual+ community. Examples include bisexual representation on television, in politics, and other public platforms. The publication's Spring 2015 issue covered the election of Kate Brown, the United States' first openly bisexual governor. News Briefs also covers news of bisexual representation in the media, including Grey's Anatomy's openly bisexual Callie Torres, and openly bisexual+ celebrities such as Lady Gaga.

=== Research corner ===
Included in many issues of BWQ, the Research Corner is a space to include important research related to bisexuality and bisexual+ identities.

== Editors ==
- Robyn Ochs - Editor (2009–present)
- Avery Friend - Assistant Editor (2024–present)
- Melissa Rorech - Assistant Editor (2024–present)
- Katelynn Bishop - Assistant Editor (2018–2024)
- LB Klein - Assistant Editor (2017–2018)
- Catherine Rock - Assistant Editor (2013–2017)
- Kate Estrop - Calendar Editor (2013–2017)
- Ellyn Ruthstrom - Calendar Editor (2009–2013); Guest Editor (2015, 2017)
- Heron Greenesmith - Guest Editor (2015)
