= Brisa Bracchi =

Brazilian politician (born 1997)

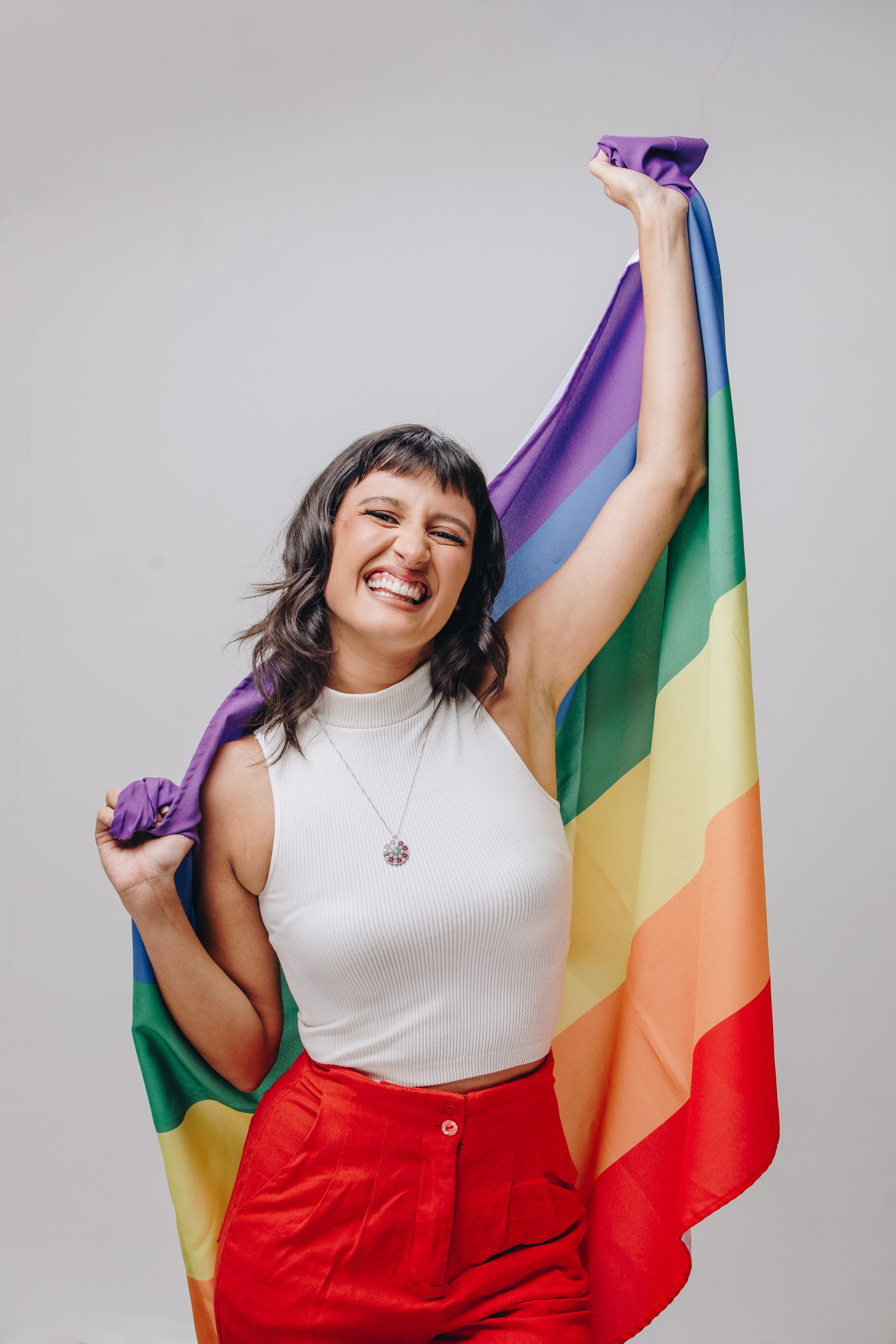
- Bracchi in 2024

Member of the Municipal Chamber of Natal
- Incumbent
- Assumed office 2020

Personal details
- Born: 20 December 1997 (age 28) Natal, Rio Grande do Norte, Brazil
- Party: Workers' Party
- Education: Federal University of Rio Grande do Norte

Brisa Silva Bracchi (born 20 December 1997) is a Brazilian politician and human rights activist. She is a member of the Workers' Party; she has served as a city councillor on the Municipal Chamber of Natal since 2020. In 2022, Bracchi was chosen as Natal's "outstanding parliamentarian", in recognition of her work introducing and passing inclusive laws in the city.

== Early life and education ==
Bracchi was born on 20 December 1997 in Natal, the capital of Rio Grande do Norte, a state in the Northeast Region of Brazil. In 2015, while in secondary school, she was active in student politics, being elected to serve as director of women for the Brazilian Union of Secondary School Students. Bracchi took part in the 2016 student protests, a series of demonstrations and school occupations against proposed changes to education by the government of then-President of Brazil, Michel Temer, including the proposed new Brazilian secondary education system and the Constitutional Amendment of the Public Expenditure Cap, which would limit government funding in education.

After completing secondary school, Bracchi started studying history at the Federal University of Rio Grande do Norte. During her time at university, she served as the general coordinator of the José Silton Pereira Central Student Directory between 2018 and 2019; Bracchi was also elected as the general secretary of State Union of Students, a student organisation associated with the National Union of Students, for Rio Grande do Norte.

After graduating from the Federal University of Rio Grande do Norte, Bracchi subsequently obtained a second degree, in environmental studies, from the Federal Institute of Rio Grande do Norte.

== Political career ==
At the age of 18, Bracchi joined the Workers' Party, a centre-left national political party. She self-identified with the party's democratic socialist bloc. When she was 21, Bracchi was elected general secretary of the Workers' Party's Natal Municipal Executive; three years later, she was named the party's state secretary for women.

Following the 2020 municipal elections, Bracchi was elected to the Municipal Chamber of Natal; she had run on a portfolio of promoting culture, education, and LGBTQ and indigenous rights; she also stated she would seek to legalise medicinal cannabis. In 2021, Bracchi became leader of the chamber's opposition bloc.

As a result of the ongoing COVID-19 pandemic, Bracchi's called for the creation of the Municipal Emergency Basic Income Programme to address inequalities in accessing healthcare among disadvantaged communities in Natal. Bracchi also successfully passed the Municipal Policy for Comprehensive Health of the LGBTI+ Population, which sought to ensure Basic Health Units were better able to serve LGBTQ+ patients, such as through knowledge and access to transgender health care. Following the conclusion of Bracchi's first year in office, she was identified by the Municipal Chamber as being the "most productive" council member.

In 2022, Bracchi authored a bill that recognised and commemorated Celebrate Bisexuality Day. She also passed the Menstruation Without Taboo law, which saw feminine hygiene products distributed to vulnerable people, as well as all schools in Natal, in addition to greater education on menstruation. Bracchi campaigned for the passing of the More Women in Culture and Advertising Without Sexism laws, as well as the creation of the Natal Film Commission.

In 2023, Bracchi authored and passed legislation that led to the Municipal Week Against Lesbophobia becoming recognised as part of Natal's official municipal calendar.

== Threats and harassment ==
In 2023 and 2024, Bracchi was among a group of Brazilian feminist and LGBTQ+ parliamentarians, including Duda Hidalgo, Daiana Santos, Rosa Amorim, Bella Gonçalves, Mônica Benício, Iza Lourença, Bia Caminha, Lohanna França and Cida Falabella, to receive threats of corrective rape via email. Bracchi reported the threats to the police and received public support from the national Workers' Party.

In 2024, Bracchi accused fellow councillor Aroldo Alves, of the liberal-conservative Brazil Union party, of misogyny after he complimented Natália Bastos Bonavides's physical appearance and scent during a plenary.

== Recognition ==
In 2023, during her third year in office, Bracchi was recognised with the 2022 Outstanding Parliamentarian Award by the Municipal Chamber of Natal, with her scoring highly in the award's categories, including transparency and accountability.
