= BECAUSE (conference) =

Annual conference on bisexuality

BECAUSE (Bisexual Empowerment Conference: A Uniting, Supportive Experience) is an annual, national conference for the bisexual community and other bi+ people that takes place in the Twin Cities in Minnesota. It was founded in 1992. It has been organized by the Bisexual Organizing Project since 1999. The conference is "dedicated to building an empowered bisexual, pansexual, fluid, queer, and unlabeled (bi+) community." It is the longest-running and largest conference for bi+ people in the United States.

== History ==
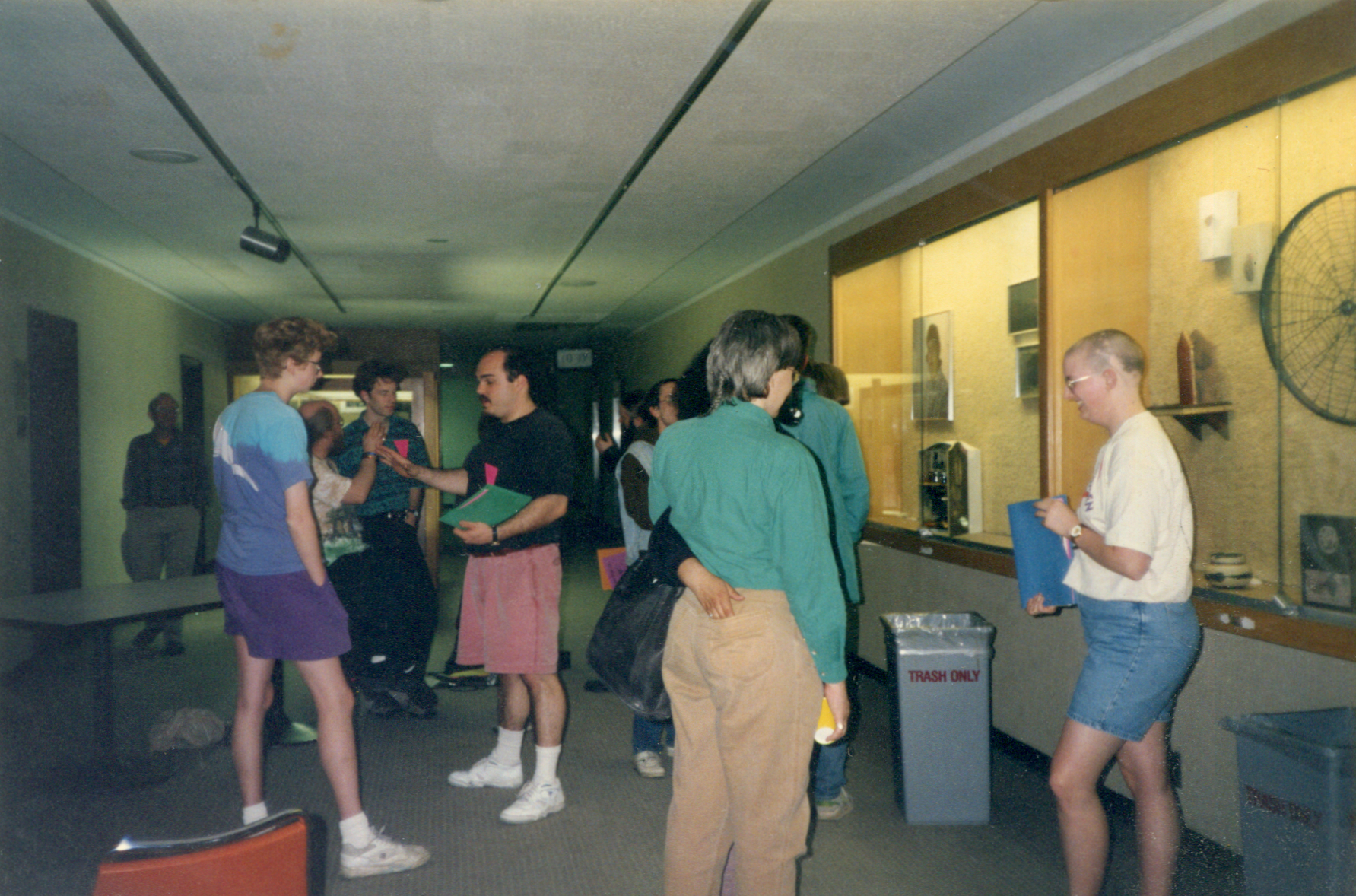
Between sessions at the conference in 1994

In 1991, the Gay and Lesbian Community Action Council (GLCAC) published a needs assessment for bisexuality in the Twin Cities. One of the needs identified in the study was more community events. As a result, the Bisexual Connection (Minnesota) sponsored the creation of BECAUSE, which stands for Bisexual Empowerment Conference: A Uniting, Supportive Experience.

The first BECAUSE was held in February 1992 in Minneapolis. The planning committee consisted of eight people. Only approximately four others preregistered. On the day of the conference, approximately 120 people showed up. The speakers included Lani Ka'ahumanu, co-editor of Bi Any Other Name: Bisexual People Speak Out.

The conference continued annually until it took a three-year break starting in 2005. In 2008, the first year the conference returned, only around 80 people attended. Funding more than quadrupled between 2008 and 2009. In 2009, over 300 people attended.

On June 4, 2014, Governor of Minnesota Mark Dayton issued a written proclamation declaring, "Bisexual Empowerment Conference, A Uniting, Supportive Experience (BECAUSE) is the largest and longest-running conference on bisexuality in the nation" and "the only annual conference on bisexuality in the United States." As a result, he declared June 6-8, 2014, Bisexual Empowerment Days in the State of Minnesota. Mayor of Minneapolis Betsy Hodges declared June 7, 2014, to be Bisexual Empowerment Day in the City Of Minneapolis. Approximately 200 people attended that year.

Over 400 people attended in 2016. The theme for the 25th anniversary conference in 2017 was Coming Home: A Bi+ Past, Present, and Future.

Robyn Ochs has presented at the conference in multiple years. She was a keynote speaker in 2009. She was also a speaker in 2019.

== Annual Conferences ==
- February 1992. Minneapolis, Minnesota. Approximately 120 attendees.
- 1999. Metropolitan State University, Saint Paul, Minnesota.
- 2004. Iowa State University, Ames, IA.
- 2008. Approximately 80 attendees.
- 2009. Approximately 300 attendees.
- April 16-18, 2010. Hamline University, St. Paul.
- 2012. 20th anniversary event. St. Paul.
- June 7-9, 2013. Augsberg University.
- June 6–8, 2014. Minneapolis, Minnesota. Approximately 200 attendees.
- April 17–19, 2015.
- April 20–22, 2016. Minneapolis, Minnesota.
- November 10–12, 2017. Metropolitan State University, Saint Paul, Minnesota.
- October 12–14, 2018. Wellstone Center, Saint Paul, Minnesota.
- October 11–13, 2019. Wellstone Center, Saint Paul, Minnesota.
- October 2–4, 2020. Wellstone Center, Saint Paul, Minnesota.

== Bisexual Organizing Project ==
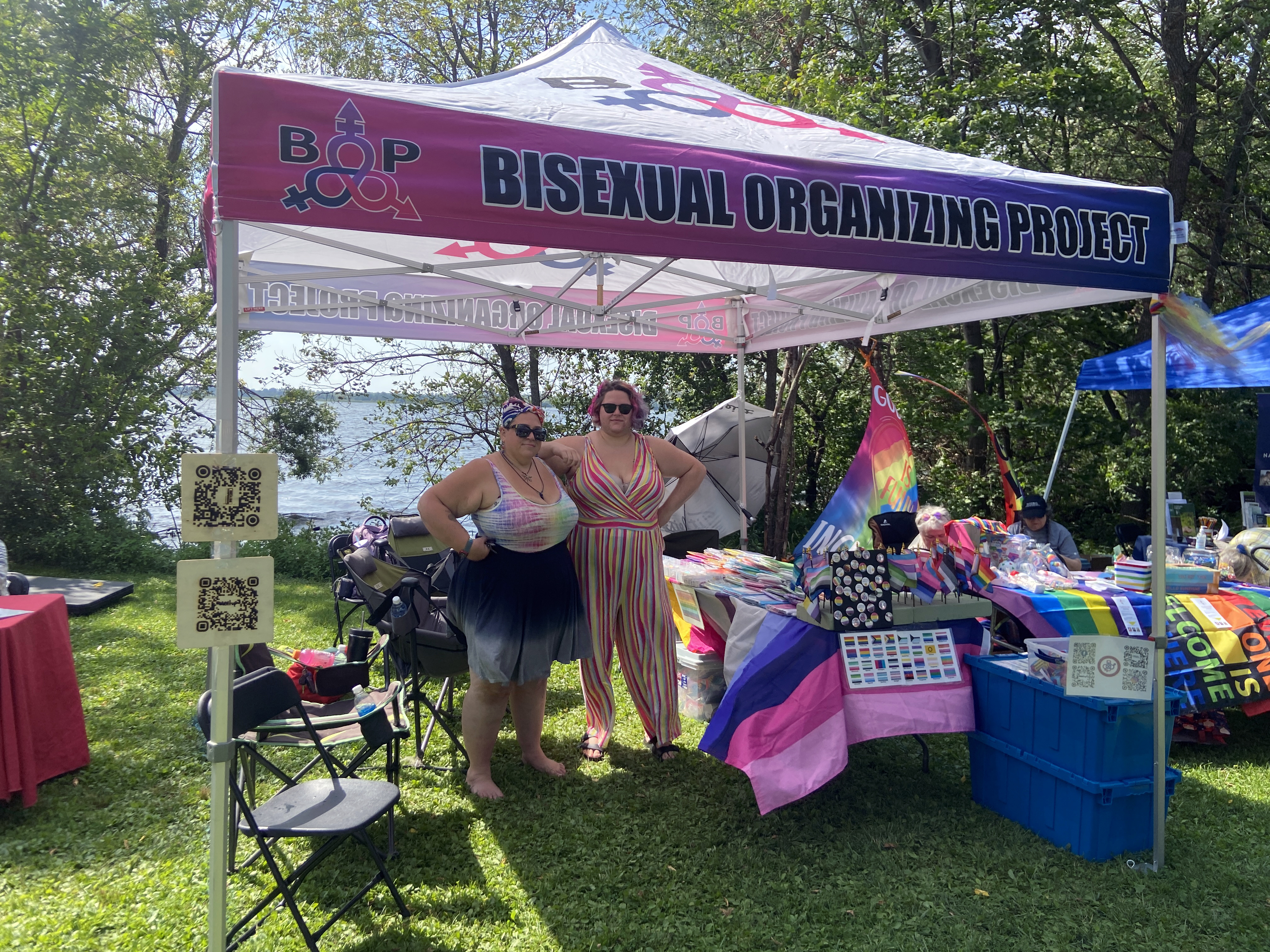
BOP booth at Bemidji Pride, Bemidji, Minnesota

The Bisexual Organizing Project (BOP) was founded in 1999 and is the organizer of BECAUSE. It is a 501(c)(3) nonprofit organization registered in Minnesota. Its mission is to "Build, serve and advocate for an empowered bisexual, pansexual, fluid, queer, and unlabeled (bi+) community to promote social justice."

BOP organizes a number of bisexual pride events in addition to BECAUSE. BOP has a contingent in Twin Cities Pride. It opened a bisexual community center in South Minneapolis Pride in 2002 (which has since closed). It organized the 8th International Conference on Bisexuality at the University of Minnesota in 2004. Since 2017, a burlesque and variety show called Bi-Lesque has been organized by BOP to help fund BOP and its programs.

=== Needs assessments ===
Following the 1991 needs assessment, BOP has published a bisexual needs assessment every 10 years. The 2001 Bisexual Social and Community Needs Assessment was published by BOP, OutFront Minnesota, and the University of Minnesota. The Bisexual Community Needs Assessment 2012 was published by BOP partnering with OutFront Minnesota, the PFund Foundation, and the Gender and Sexuality Student Services Office (GSSSO) at the Metropolitan State University. Its main findings were that the bisexual community needed "greater meaningful inclusion in 'LGBT' organizations" and "to build a more robust bisexual community."

=== BiReConUSA ===
In June 2013, BOP and the American Institute of Bisexuality funded the first BiReConUSA, modeled on BiReCon (UK). It was co-chaired by Dr. Lauren Beach and Alex Iantaffi.

== See also ==
- Bisexuality in the United States
- Bisexual community
- Creating Change Conference
