= Bi-curious =

Person who is attracted to experiencing bisexuality

Bi-curious flag

Bi-curious (also bicurious) describes a person, usually someone who is a self-identified heterosexual, who is curious or open about engaging in sexual activity with a person whose sex differs from that of their usual sexual partners. The term is sometimes used to describe a broad continuum of sexual orientation between heterosexuality and bisexuality. Such continuums include mostly heterosexual or mostly homosexual, but these can be self-identified without identifying as bisexual.

The terms heteroflexible and homoflexible are mainly applied to bi-curious people, though some authors distinguish heteroflexibility and homoflexibility as lacking the "wish to experiment with sexuality" implied by the bi-curious label. It is important when discussing this continuum to conclude that bisexuality is distinct from heterosexuality and homosexuality rather than simply an extension of said sexualities like the labels heteroflexibility and homoflexibility would imply, due to the prominent erasure and assimilation of bisexuality into other identity groups. To sum it up, the difference between bisexual and bicurious is that bisexual people know that they are sexually attracted to both genders based on personal experience. Bicurious people are still maneuvering their way through their sexuality.

Bi-curious is not to be confused with forms of sexual fluidity, defined as a "capacity for situation-dependent flexibility in sexual responsiveness," as bi-curious implies the existence of one set sexuality for the individual who carries the label, even if it is currently unknown, rather than an acknowledgment that the individual's sexual preference has changed and will continue to change that comes with sexual fluidity.

== Bi-curiosity and other non-monosexual identities ==
Standard theories of bi-sexuality make use of the term bisexual umbrella to encompass multiple other non-monosexual identities (sexual identities that allow for multiple gender identity possibilities in partners) that are possible outcomes of exploration for bi-curious people. However, similar on the surface, bisexuality and the subsequent elements of its umbrella are distinct, thus leading to the possibility that a currently bi-curious person may end up as neither bisexual, homosexual, or heterosexual, but another non-monosexual identity altogether. This umbrella can be better broken into further sexual identities, with bisexuality normally including two groups that encompass attraction to the persons own gender and other genders (which will usually include non-binary gender identities too). At the same time, pansexuality includes attraction to an individual regardless of what gender identity they label themselves. The relevance to a bi-curious person is at what range does their exploration end.

== Etymology ==
The term started becoming popular after 1984, according to Merriam-Webster, but The New Partridge Dictionary of Slang and Unconventional English and Oxford Dictionaries' Lexico claim that the term was coined in 1990. According to Dictionary.com, the term was first used between 1980 and 1985.

== See also ==
- Bambi effect
- Sexual fluidity
