= Plurisexuality =

Attraction to more than one sex or gender

- Pronunciation: /plʊəˈrisɛkʃuælɪti/
- Definition: Attraction to more than one gender
- Subcategories: Bisexuality, pansexuality, omnisexuality, polysexuality

Other terms
- Synonyms: Multisexuality, multiple-gender attraction
- Associated terms: Pluriromanticism (romantic orientation analogue)

Flag
- Plurisexual flag Plurisexual flag
- Flag name: Plurisexual flag

Plurisexuality or multisexuality is a term used to describe individuals who are romantically or sexually attracted to people of multiple sexes or genders. This includes certain sexual identities such as bisexuality, pansexuality, omnisexuality, and polysexuality, falling under the umbrella of non-monosexuality, which encompasses all sexualities that are not exclusively heterosexual or homosexual. It is also referred to as multiple-gender attraction (MGA). Plurisexual individuals may experience sexual attraction to people of different genders, which can include but is not limited to men, women, non-binary, genderqueer, and other gender identities. Plurisexuality can be fluid and may vary from person to person. Abrosexual, for example, can be used to describe when one's experience changes in their attractions over time.

Multisexual was also used to describe multicultural sexual diversity, among other things.

Some plurisexual people may feel represented by the bisexual umbrella; however, not every plurisexual identifies as bisexual. While more specific and less known plurisexual identities exist, bisexuality and pansexuality are more established and understood concepts within the LGBT community and among the general public, but they may experience monosexism, erasure, and heteronormativity.

== See also ==
- Allosexuality
- Gray asexuality
- Heteroflexibility
- Multiromantic
- Non-heterosexual
- Sapphism
- Pomosexual
- Queer
