= Meg-John Barker =

British psychologist and author (born 1974)

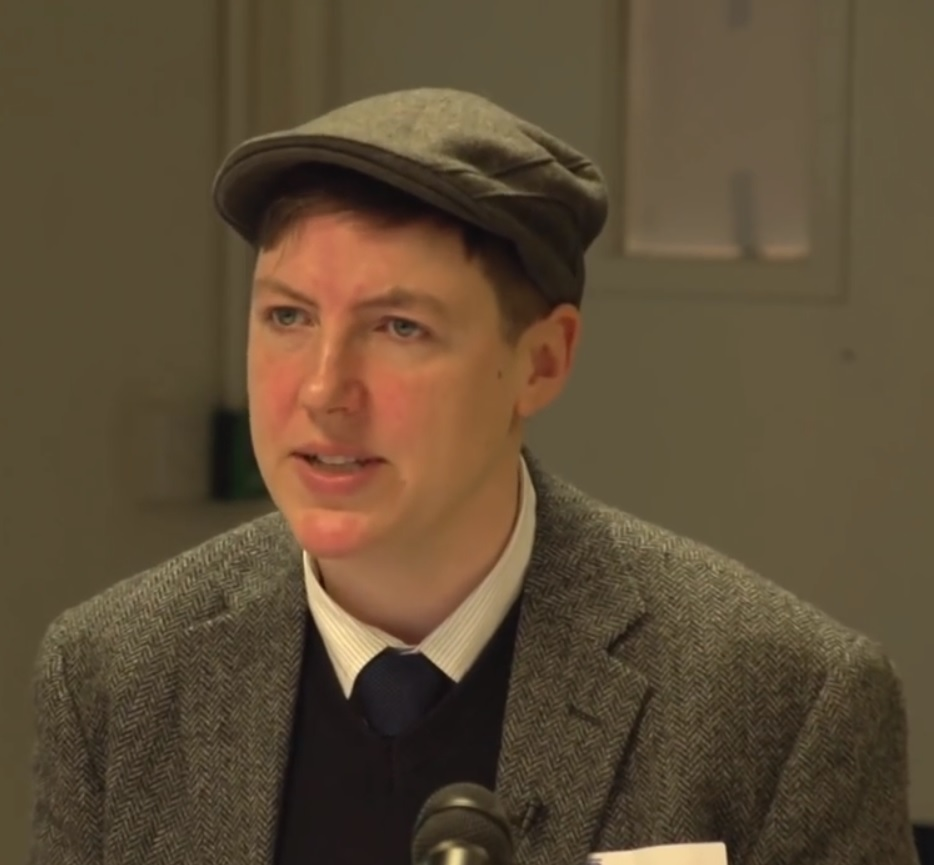
- Meg-John Barker speaks about bisexuality in 2016
- Born: 23 June 1974 (age 52); Hull, England
- Education: PhD Psychology, University of Nottingham; MA Psychotherapy, University of Sheffield
- Occupations: writer, writing mentor, creative consultant, and speaker
- Years active: 2003–present
- Known for: writer on queer, sexuality, relationships, and gender. Authority on open non-monogamy, bisexuality, non-binary gender, and BDSM
- Website: www.rewriting-the-rules.com

Meg-John Barker (born 23 June 1974) is an English writer, writing mentor, creative consultant, speaker, and independent scholar. They have written a number of anti self-help books on the topics of relationships, sex, and gender, as well as the graphic non-fiction books, Queer: A Graphic History and Gender: A Graphic Guide, and the book The Psychology of Sex. They are the writer of the relationships book and blog Rewriting the Rules, and they have a podcast with sex educator Justin Hancock.

Barker is a full-time writer, as well as being a writing mentor, creative consultant, speaker, and independent scholar. Barker holds a PhD in Psychology from the University of Nottingham, and worked for two decades as an academic psychologist at the Open University in the United Kingdom, and as a psychotherapist specialising in sex, gender, and relationships.

Barker has written and/or edited some of the first academic collections on open non-monogamy, bisexuality, non-binary gender and BDSM. They were editor of the journal Psychology & Sexuality from 2010 to 2017, and lead author of The Bisexuality Report and the BACP document on Gender, Sexual, and Relationship Diversity.

Barker's pronouns are singular they/them.

== Early life and education ==
Barker was born in Hull, England, on 23 June 1974, grew up in Bradford, and holds a PhD in Psychology from the University of Nottingham. After teaching at a number of higher education institutions, Barker became an associate professor of psychology at the Open University, having also qualified with an MA in Psychotherapy from the University of Sheffield and trained at the major NHS sexual and relationship clinic at Guy's Hospital for several years.

== Recent career ==
Barker's main area of expertise is human sexuality, gender and romantic relationships, with a focus on the experiences of people in sexual, gender and relationship communities located outside the mainstream – particularly polyamorous, kink, non-binary and bisexual communities. Theoretically their work draws on social constructionism, existentialism and Buddhist philosophy. Barker, with co-author Darren Langdridge, has published two edited collections on sadomasochism and on non-monogamy, and a recent book for mental health professionals (co-authored with Christina Richards). Barker founded the journal of Psychology & Sexuality together with Langdridge in 2010, and they co-edited it until 2017. Barker co-organized the Critical Sexology series from 2006 to 2018, and BiReCon (a biennial research conference which takes place prior to the annual BiCon event).

=== Writing ===
Barker coined the phrase ‘anti self-help’ to describe self-help materials which locate the struggles that people have in their wider societal structures and cultural messages rather than in them as individuals. Barker's anti self-help books aim to help people to navigate their relationship with wider sociocultural understandings, rather than viewing themselves as a problem that needs fixing. They have produced books applying this approach to relationships, sex (with Justin Hancock), and gender (with Alex Iantaffi), as well as producing graphic-novel style non-fiction books and zines on queer, mindfulness and other topics, and a podcast on sex and relationships.

=== Consulting ===
Barker has a background in psychotherapy, and led production on the Open University module Counselling: Exploring Fear and Sadness. They are trained in existential psychotherapy and mindfulness with books on the latter developing the approaches of social mindfulness and mindful sex and relationship therapy (MSRT). Their practice now takes the form of peer-to-peer consulting and mentoring with writers, practitioners, activists, and organizers, with a focus on relationships with self, others, and the wider world.

=== Activism ===
Barker's activism in the area of LGBT&Q rights has been recognized by placement in the top 40 of The Independent on Sunday newspaper's Pink List, and Rainbow List. Barker was one of the founder members of BiUK, the organization for bisexual research and activism. This group wrote the international guidelines for academics studying bisexuality (published in Journal of Bisexuality) and produced The Bisexuality Report which informs UK policy and practice regarding bisexuality based on the evidence regarding biphobia, bisexual invisibility, and mental health In 2013, Barker took home an Erotic Award in the academic category for the book Rewriting the Rules, as reported in Times Higher Education. Their current activism focuses on trans and non-binary communities.

== Works ==
=== Books (as author) ===
- Barker, M. (2003) Introductory Psychology: History, Themes and Perspectives. Exeter: Learning Matters Ltd. ISBN 978-1903337172
- Richards, C & Barker, M. (2013) Sexuality and Gender for Counsellors, Psychologists and Health Professionals: A Practical Guide. London: Sage. ISBN 978-0857028433
- Barker, M. (2013) Mindfulness in Counselling & Psychotherapy: Practising Mindfully Across Approaches and Issues. London: Sage. ISBN 978-1446211113
- Barker, M.-J. & Gabb, J. (2016) The Secrets of Enduring Love: How to Make Relationships Last. London: Penguin RandomHouse. ISBN 978-1785040238
- Barker, M.-J. & Scheele, J. (2016) Queer: A Graphic History. London: Icon Books. ISBN 978-1785780714
- Barker, M.-J. & Hancock, J. (2017) Enjoy Sex (How, When and If You Want To): A Practical and Inclusive Guide. London: Icon Books. ISBN 978-1785780806
- Iantaffi, A. & Barker, M.-J. (2017) How to Understand Your Gender: A Practical Guide for Exploring Who You Are. London: Jessica Kingsley. ISBN 978-1785927461
- Barker, M.-J. (2018) Rewriting the Rules: An Anti Self-help Guide to Love, Sex and Relationships. Second edition. London: Routledge. ISBN 978-1138043596
- Barker, M.-J. (2018) The Psychology of Sex. London: Routledge ISBN 978-1138676497
- Barker, M.-J., Gill, R. & Harvey, L. (2018) Mediated Intimacy: Sex Advice in Media Culture. London: Polity. ISBN 978-1509509126
- Barker, M.-J. & Iantaffi, A. (2019) Life Isn't Binary: On Being Both, Beyond, and In-Between. London: Jessica Kingsley. ISBN 978-1785924798
- Barker, M.-J. & Scheele, J. (2019) Gender: A Graphic Guide. London: Icon Books. ISBN 978-1785784521

=== Books (as editor) ===
- Langdridge, D. & Barker M. (2007) Safe, Sane and Consensual: Contemporary Perspectives on Sadomasochism, Basingstoke: Palgrave Macmillan. ISBN 978-0230517745
- Barker, M., Vossler, A. & Langdridge, D. (Eds.) (2010) Understanding Counselling and Psychotherapy. London: Sage. ISBN 978-1849204767
- Langdridge, D. & Barker M. (Eds.) (2010) Understanding Non-monogamies. New York: Routledge. ISBN 978-0415800556
- Brotto, L. & Barker, M. (Eds.) (2014) Mindfulness in Sexual and Relationship Therapy. Abingdon: Taylor & Francis. ISBN 978-0415736961
- Richards, C. & Barker, M. (Eds.) (2015) The Palgrave Handbook of the Psychology of Sexuality & Gender. Basingstoke: Palgrave Macmillan. ISBN 978-1137345882
- Vossler, A., Havard, C., Pike, G. Barker, M.-J. & Raabe, B. (Eds.) (2017) Mad or Bad? A Critical Approach to Counselling and Forensic Psychology. London: Sage. ISBN 978-1473963528
- Richards, C., Bouman, W. & Barker, M.-J. (Eds.) (2018) Genderqueer and Non-Binary Genders. Basingstoke: Palgrave Macmillan. ISBN 978-1473963528

=== Reports ===
- Barker, M., Richards, C., Jones, R., Bowes-Catton, H., & Plowman, T. (2012). The Bisexuality Report: Bisexual Inclusion in LGBT equality and diversity. Milton Keynes: The Open University, Centre for Citizenship, Identity and Governance. ISBN 978-0415517638
- Shaw, L., Butler, C. Langdridge, D., Gibson, S., Barker, M., Lenihan, P., Nair R., & Richards, C. (2012). Guidelines for psychologists working therapeutically with sexual and gender minority clients. Leicester: British Psychological Society.
- Attwood, F., Bale, C. & Barker, M. (Eds.) (2013). The Sexualization Report. Funded by The Wellcome Trust.
- Barker, M-J. (2017). BACP Good Practice in Action Fact Sheet 095: Gender, Sexual, and Relationship Diversity (GSRD). London: British Association of Counselling & Psychotherapy.

=== Selected articles and book chapters ===
- Barker, M. (2005). This is my partner, and this is my... partner's partner: Constructing a polyamorous identity in a monogamous world.Journal of Constructivist Psychology 18: 75–88.
- Ritchie, A. & Barker, M. (2006). ‘There aren’t words for what we do or how we feel so we have to make them up’: Constructing polyamorous languages in a culture of compulsory monogamy. Sexualities 9: 584–601.
- Barker, M. (2007). Heteronormativity and the exclusion of bisexuality in psychology. In V. Clarke & E. Peel (Eds.) Out in Psychology: Lesbian, Gay, Bisexual, Trans and Queer Perspectives. pp. 95–117. Chichester: Wiley
- Barker, M. & Langdridge, D. (2010). Whatever happened to non-monogamies? Critical reflections on recent research and theory. Sexualities 13: 748–772.

=== Journal editorships ===
- Psychology & Sexuality. Taylor & Francis ISSN 1941-9899
