= Bambi effect (slang) =

LGBT slang

The Bambi effect, in LGBT slang, is a young gay man's foray into heterosexuality: "the turning of a young (otherwise homosexual) man's fancy to (heterosexual) love" by reference to "the 'twitter-pated' Bambi" leaving Thumper in the 1942 movie Bambi.

== Background ==
In The Gay Report, it was described as the effect "where the young males in spring all suddenly turn their attention away from each other towards females with puffy cheeks, red lips, batting eyelashes, etc.—where even Bambi and Thumper don't need each other any more".

== See also ==
- Bi-curious
- Sexual fluidity
