= Getting Bi =

English anthology edited by Robyn Ochs and Sarah E. Rowley

Getting Bi: Voices of Bisexuals Around the World
- Cover of Getting Bi: Voices of Bisexuals Around the World (2nd ed.)
- Author: Robyn Ochs and Sarah E. Rowley
- Language: English
- Subject: Bisexuality
- Publisher: Bisexual Resource Center
- Publication date: 2005 (first edition); 2009 (second edition)
- Publication place: United States
- Pages: 273
- ISBN: 978-0-9653881-5-3

Getting Bi: Voices of Bisexuals Around the World is an English anthology edited by Robyn Ochs and Sarah E. Rowley. It is an important book in the history of the modern bisexual rights movement and appears on numerous bisexual and general LGBT reading lists.

The book is composed of short essays by 184 predominantly bisexual people ranging in age from 15 to 79 years of different classes, races, and experiences speaking about their lives. The authors are from 42 countries on 6 continents and the book includes 15 pieces translated into English, primarily from Spanish and Mandarin.

Paula Ettelbrick, Executive Director of the International Gay and Lesbian Human Rights Commission said "Getting Bi is one of the most important recent contributions to the global struggle for human rights. By enriching our understanding of bisexuality within so many cultural and geographic contexts, this anthology serves as a magnificent tool for building support and respect for the sexual rights of each one of us."

It is organized into nine themed chapters including "What is Bisexuality?", "Coming Out as Bisexual", "Why Bi? (Coming to Terms)", "Life Stories", "Crossing Lines", "Bi's in Relationships", "Language of Desire", "Bisexual Politics", "Bi Community", and "Bisexual Worlds", with additional sections of brief articles and resource lists.

The first edition came out in 2005; the second and most recent edition came out in 2009.

== See also ==
- Bisexual community
- Biphobia
- Bisexual erasure
- Queer studies
