= Bicon =

Bicon may refer to:

- BiCon (UK), an annual gathering of bi+ people in the UK, or its international equivalent
- Bicon Dental Implants, a US maker of dental implants
- Intermodal_container#U.S._military, a small shipping container
