= Pansexual flag =

Flag used by the pansexual community

- Use: Symbol of pansexuality to distinguish it from bisexuality
- Proportion: 3:5
- Adopted: 2010
- Design: Three equally-sized horizontal bars: magenta, yellow, cyan
- Designed by: Jasper V.

The pansexual flag is a magenta, yellow and cyan flag, designed as a symbol for the pansexual community to increase its visibility and recognition, and distinguish itself from bisexuality.

== History and use ==
The flag was originally posted in 2010 on an anonymous Tumblr account by its creator Jasper V. The flag functions as a symbol of the pansexual community like the rainbow flag is used as a symbol for lesbian, gay, bisexual, transgender people and anyone else in the LGBTQ community.

== Design and symbolism ==
The pansexual flag consists of three equally-sized colored horizontal bars, which are—from top to bottom—magenta, yellow, and cyan.

Some sources state that the cyan represents attraction to men, magenta represents attraction to women, and yellow represents attraction to non-binary people such as those who are agender, bigender and genderfluid.

	Hex triplet	Color
Magenta	#FF218C	
Yellow	#FFD800	
Cyan	#21B1FF	

== See also ==
- Pride flag
- Bisexual flag
