= Duda Hidalgo =

Brazilian politician (born 1999)

Member of the Legislative Assembly of São Paulo
- Incumbent
- Assumed office 1 February 2027

Personal details
- Born: 17 June 1999 (age 27)
- Party: Workers' Party

Maria Eduarda Alencar Hidalgo (born 17 June 1999), better known as Duda Hidalgo, is a Brazilian politician who was elected member of the Legislative Assembly of São Paulo in 2026. She has been a municipal councillor of Ribeirão Preto since 2021.
