= Non-heterosexual =

Sexual orientation other than heterosexual

The rainbow flag is the symbol of non-heterosexual people.

Non-heterosexual is a word for a sexual orientation or sexual identity that is not heterosexual. The term helps define the "concept of what is the norm and how a particular group is different from that norm". Non-heterosexual is used in feminist and gender studies fields, as well as in general academic literature, to help differentiate between sexual identities that are chosen, prescribed, or simply assumed, with varying understandings of the implications of those identities. The term is similar to queer, though less politically charged and more clinical; queer generally refers to being non-normative and non-heterosexual. Some view the term as being contentious and pejorative as it "labels people against the perceived norm of heterosexuality, thus reinforcing heteronormativity". Still, others say non-heterosexual is the only term useful to maintaining coherence in research and suggest it "highlights a shortcoming in our language around sexual identity"; for instance, its use can enable bisexual erasure.

== Background ==
Many gay, lesbian and bisexual people were born into different cultures and religions that stigmatized, repressed or negatively judged any sexuality that differed from a heterosexual identity and orientation. Additionally the majority of heterosexuals still view non-heterosexual acts as taboo and non-conventional sexual desires are generally hidden entirely or masked in various ways. Non-heterosexual is more fully inclusive of people who not only identify as other than heterosexual but also as other than gay, lesbian and bisexual. Some common examples include same gender loving, men who have sex with men (MSM), women who have sex with women (WSW), bi-curious and questioning. Non-heterosexual is considered a better general term than homosexual, lesbian and gay, LGBT or queer for being more neutral and without the baggage or gender discrimination that comes with many of the alternatives. For instance, until 1973, the American Psychological Association listed homosexual as a mental illness, and it still has negative connotations.

== Usage ==
Non-heterosexual is found predominantly in research and scholarly environments possibly as a means to avoid terms deemed politically incorrect like lesbian, dyke, gay, bisexual, etc. that lesbian, gay, and bisexual (LGB) people use as self descriptors. When used by those who do not identify as LGB or when used by LGB people disparagingly, the terms are generally considered pejorative, so non-heterosexual is a default and innocuous term unlikely to offend readers. For example, the Kinsey scale can be divided between those exclusively heterosexual and everyone else. The term has come into more prominence in the academic field starting in the 1980s and more prominently in the 1990s with major studies of identities of non-heterosexual youth and a smaller number of studies specifically looking at non-heterosexual college students. Non-heterosexual is also used to encompass transgender and intersex people, because although these are gender identities rather than sexual identities, they are within the LGBT and queer umbrella communities. Additionally, non-heterosexual encompasses a wide variety of terms used by different cultures whose own terms might never neatly translate to a homosexual or bisexual identity; for researching and extrapolating data it is a practical and accepted term.

In a 2004 book that integrates "the academic disciplines of cinema studies, sociology, cultural and critical studies" regarding the Big Brother phenomena, non-heterosexual was used as a universal term to help compare information from over thirty countries. In exploring and studying the emerging field of gay, lesbian and bisexual seniors, non-heterosexual is a default term to demonstrate that the "vast majority" of literature assumes that older people are heterosexual and makes "no effort" to explore the experiences and attitudes of those who are not. In Welfare and the State, the authors describe the perceived advantages of lesbians in the workplace as they, in theory, would not have children so would be advantageous to the labor force. The authors point out, however, that not only do many lesbians have children but they routinely identify as heterosexual through much of their lives or at least until their children are old enough that a non-heterosexual identity would not greatly impact their families negatively.

Non-heterosexual is also used when studying lesbian and gay families and family structures. It came into wider use in this context when the AIDS pandemic's impact on gay male communities was being explored as many gay men created families out of extended networks of friends and these became their support systems.

== Criticism ==
Jonathan Ned Katz argues that historically, the term was used to force people into one of two distinct identities, a form of "apartheid" that distinguished the "Sexual Normal" from the "Sexual Pervert".

Margaret Denike and Patrick Hopkins have argued that "heterosexism and homophobia are founded on and sustained by binary gender categories, specifically the assumption that there are distinct and proper masculine and feminine gender roles and identities against which deviation is measured." According to Erika Feigenbaum, the use of the term non-heterosexual indicates a departure from what is acceptable in society while highlighting the juxtaposition between the ideal heterosexual and unideal non-heterosexual, stating, "Heterosexism is about dominance, and the practices that support it are often replicated, reinforced, and reflected by the attitudes, behaviors, and practices of even [the] best-intentioned allies."

Although "non-heterosexuality" is considered a blanket term for all LGBTQ identities, it is often interpreted as another word for homosexual which contributes to the continuation of systematic bisexual erasure. Bisexuality has a long history of being overshadowed and ignored in favour of the belief in monosexuality, it "[represents] a blind spot in sex research." The term non-heterosexual suggests a division between heterosexual and homosexual, the heterosexual-homosexual dichotomy, rather than the heterosexual-homosexual continuum, which accounts for identities that are not exclusively heterosexual or homosexual. By separating identities into either/or, bisexual identities are left in a place of ambiguity, "bisexuals transgress boundaries of sexually identified communities and thus are always both inside and outside a diversity of conflicting communities." The implied homosexual-heterosexual dichotomy that the term puts in place negates its use as a truly inclusive term; "[the] categories are constructed in such a way as to allow everyone access to one and only one, and to insist that anyone who is not already neatly situated in one category or the other had best be on the way to one." This focus on either/or logic, heterosexuality or non-heterosexuality, where non-heterosexuality is closely associated with homosexuality rather than general queerness, slights those that the term attempts to describe; "where bisexuality does rate a mention, it is almost always rendered an epistemological and incidental by-product, aftereffect, or definitional outcome of the opposition of hetero/homosexuality."

Non-heterosexuality is often used to describe those in the LGBT+ community with non-cisgender identities. This is seen as problematic as sexual orientation and gender identity are different. However the distinction between the two is relatively modern. Historically "[transgender people] were classified as homosexuals by everyone, including the physicians who specialized in their treatment, and it is only in the past fifty years or so that transgender has been theorized as different in kind from homosexuality." Many people still fail to understand or make the distinction between gender minorities and sexual minorities.

Queer people "are often expected to account for [their] sexual identifications by either proving [their] normality (that is, [they] are inside the sphere of heteronormativity), or by accepting that [their] difference from the heterosexual norm constitutes some form of essence." The term non-heterosexual is used to highlight the absolute difference between heterosexual and queer identities. The language needs to change to describe LGBTQ people as autonomous beings "rather than considering [them] solely as sexual beings constituted within a heterosexual logic of sameness or difference." The implied binary that the term non-heterosexual perpetuates erases those whose identities fall in the spectrum between heterosexuality and homosexuality. The hetero/homosexual dichotomy continues the systematic erasure of bisexual identities by emphasizing an assumed oppositeness with nothing allowed in between. It ignores those who identify as non-binary, as the term non-heterosexuality has been interpreted as categorizing those who are sexually attracted to people of the 'same sex' as opposed to those who are attracted to those of the 'opposite sex.'

== See also ==
- Gender binary
- Heterosexism
- Heterosexual–homosexual continuum
- Sexual diversity
