= International Conference on Bisexuality =

- Genre: Bisexuality
- Location: Varies
- Country: Varies
- Inaugurated: October 1991
- Founder: Fritz Klein et al.
- Attendance: 200–1000 (approx.)

The International Conference on Bisexuality (ICB), also known as the International BiCon, was a periodic gathering of bisexual activists and academics from around the world.

Started by Fritz Klein and a group of fellow activists, the first ICB was held in Amsterdam in 1991 and followed the concept of a BiCon started in the UK in 1984 and San Francisco in 1990. The last one was 2010 in London.

== Past events ==
Number	Date	Location	Country	Attendance	Notes
1st ICB	October 1991	Amsterdam	Netherlands	250	--
2nd ICB	23–25 June 1992	London	UK	253	Held at a church in North London
3rd ICB	24 June 1994	New York City	United States	350	The event was held in the week prior to the 25th Stonewall Anniversary Parade. A large number of participants at the conference marched under an "International Bisexuals" banner in the parade.
4th ICB	October 1996	Berlin	Germany	196	--
5th ICB	3–5 April 1998	Harvard University, Cambridge, Massachusetts	United States	910	Held over 140 workshops, panels, or performances; "largest-ever gathering of bisexual advocates from around the globe"
6th ICB	25–28 August 2000	University of Manchester	UK	265	This event was held in combination with the UK's BiCon 18
7th ICB	25–28 October 2002	Sydney	Australia	80	Coincided with Mardis Gras and the Gay Games
8th ICB	5–8 August 2004	University of Minnesota—Twin Cities Campus Minneapolis	United States	225	This conference was hosted by the Bisexual Organizing Project.
9th ICB	15–18 June 2006	Ryerson University Toronto	Canada	200	This conference was hosted by the Toronto Bisexuality Education Project. It offered 57 workshops and included keynote addresses from Dr. Loraine Hutchins and researcher Trevor Jacques.
10th ICB	26–30 August 2010	London	UK	454	This event was held in combination with the UK's BiCon 28. During the 9th ICB this was announced as being the 11th, however the 10th ICB had no immediate takers. Although work was then done on the issue, a planned conference in 2008 in Rhode Island, United States failed to get off the ground. The 2010 ICB in the United Kingdom was consequently the 10th.

== See also ==
- BiCon (UK)
- Bisexual community
