= Natália Bastos Bonavides =

Brazilian politician

Natália Bonavides
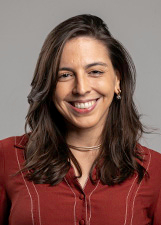
- Bonavides in 2024

Member of the Chamber of Deputies
- Incumbent
- Assumed office 1 February 2019
- Constituency: Rio Grande do Norte

Member of the Municipal Chamber of Natal
- In office 1 January 2017 – 1 February 2019
- Constituency: At-large

Personal details
- Born: Natália Bastos Bonavides; 15 June 1988 (age 38) Natal, Rio Grande do Norte, Brazil
- Party: PT (2012–present)
- Education: Federal University of Rio Grande do Norte
- Occupation: Lawyer

Natália Bastos Bonavides (born 15 June 1988) is a Brazilian lawyer and politician. She served as city council of Natal and as federal deputy for Rio Grande do Norte.

== Biography ==
A lawyer with a master's degree in Constitutional law, Natália Bonavides began her activism in the student movement. She served as a leader of the Amaro Cavalcanti Academic Center, representing the law students of the Federal University of Rio Grande do Norte (UFRN).

In social movements, she worked as a lawyer for the Landless Workers' Movement (MST), the Movement for the Struggle in Neighborhoods, Villages and Slums (MLB), the Movement of Homeless People, and was politically active with the World March of Women. She was one of the founders of the Popular Law Office, the first organization in the state to provide legal assistance to social movements. She also served as a lawyer for the Municipal Workers' Union of Natal.

A member of the Workers’ Party (PT), in 2016 she was elected the fifth most-voted city councilor of the capital of Rio Grande do Norte, with 6,202 votes. In the 2018 elections, she was elected federal deputy by the PT/PCdoB/PHS coalition with 112,998 votes. She was the second most-voted candidate and the only woman elected from her state, and the most voted in Natal, where she received 43,714 votes. In the 2022 elections, she was re-elected federal deputy, being the most voted candidate in Rio Grande do Norte, with 157,549 votes (8.42% of valid votes).

Bonavides ran for mayor in the 2024 Natal municipal election, surprising observers in the final stretch and reaching the second round. However, she was not successful in the election, finishing second in the runoff with 179,714 votes (44.66% of valid votes).
