= Gender-blind =

Social attitude

In education, business, law, and other fields, gender blindness or sex blindness is the practice of disregarding gender as a significant factor in interactions between people and applying equal rules across genders (formal equality of opportunity).

== In education ==
Krista Ratcliffe writes that gender blindness functions in the classroom to downplay the existence of gender differences, which tends to reinforce existing gender substantive inequality.

The National Student Genderblind Campaign, founded in the United States in 2006, has argued in favor of gender-neutral campus housing at colleges and universities to better serve gay, lesbian, bisexual, transgender, and intersex students.

== In health care ==
The use of mixed-gender hospital rooms has proved controversial in both the United Kingdom and Canada. Manitoba's Health Minister, Theresa Oswald, has campaigned actively against such rooms, saying that if humanity can "put somebody on the moon", it can find a way to honor gender requests without leading to delays for patients. Great Britain agreed to phase out such rooms by 2010.

Some medical ethicists have been critical of efforts to return to single-sex rooms. Jacob M. Appel, an advocate for mixed rooms in the United States, has written that opposition to gender-mixed rooms stems from "old-fashioned prejudice", arguing: "Because some people have been brought up to fear or dislike sharing a room with a person of the opposite sex, or blush at the prospect of catching a glimpse of an unwelcome body part when a robe slips open, we enshrine and perpetuate this prejudice in social policy."

== In law ==
The legal test of the "reasonable person" has been criticised for being genderblind to be applied in some areas of the law, particularly sexual harassment. Women are subjected to more normalised and endemic sexual harassment than men. On the grounds of this, the American case of Ellison v. Brady 924 F.2d 872 (1991), the court held that "a sex-blind reasonable person standard tends to be male-based and tends to systematically ignore the experiences of women".

== Research ==
Gendered treatment prevails all over the world. Of a study of organisations which offered women-only services, 23% said that their reason was based on women's inequality and the desire to address that imbalance; 20% that women-only spaces promote female development and empowerment; 18% that they were providing a service not being met by unisex services and which focused on the specific needs of women.

Studies indicate a broad support for single-sex service options to remain available. In a 2011 poll of 1,000 women by the Women's Resource Centre, 97% stated that women should have the option of accessing female-only services if they were victims of sexual assault. 57% indicated that they would choose a women-only gym over a mixed gym. Single-sex services can provide greater comfort and engagement for participants who would otherwise not get involved.

== See also ==
- All-women shortlists
- Color blindness (race)
- Equal opportunity
- Gender-neutral language
- Genderqueer
- Postgenderism
- Sex separation
- Third gender
- Unisex
- Pansexuality
