= BiCon (UK) =

Annual bisexual gathering in the UK

The BiCon (more formally known as the UK National Bisexual Convention or UK National Bisexual Conference), is the largest and most consistent annual gathering of the United Kingdom's bisexual community.

While the format does vary, the typical format is a long weekend over four days consisting of workshops, discussions, meetings and social events. Although being billed as a "bisexual" event, it is open to partners of bisexuals, supporters, non-bisexuals, non-definers, and anyone else interested in issues relevant to bisexuals. To that extent it can often be characterised as a nexus of the sexual freedom and queer movements. Each BiCon event usually attracts between 200 and 400 people. The event frequently changes location in England. It has only visited places such as Wales, once or twice since inception.

== History ==
In December 1984 the London Bisexual Group (in association with the now defunct zine Bi-Monthly) ran a conference called "The Politics of Bisexuality" at The Factory Community Project in Highbury. Around 40 people attended and judged the event to be a huge success. A second event was then attended by over fifty people in April 1985. Unfortunately the venue used, the London Lesbian and Gay Centre, had just decided to ban bisexuals (and some other groups) from their premises. This did not stop the conferences which soon gained popularity in a Britain devoid of bisexual-focused events.

That following October the Edinburgh Bisexual Group took up the torch and ran an event called "Bisexuality and the Politics of Sex". This established the idea of conferences moving around the nation. The next was run by a bisexual women's group in London. By this point the community was starting to know what they wanted from BiCon – a chance to meet other bisexuals (and their allies) from across the country, discuss sexuality issues, relax in the company of like-minded folk and network.

Armed with an agreed purpose, for the next few years the conference alternated between venues in London and Edinburgh. Then in 1989 it branched out to Coventry. As well as being the first one outside the two capitals, it was also the first to be residential (previously, people from outside the host city had either booked accommodation privately or stayed with local attendees) and to use the name 'BiCon', in part because of the organisers' and venue's experience with SF Cons (Science Fiction conventions).

A range of cities and towns have hosted it since. Over time BiCon has evolved to fit with the needs of the community. The word 'conference' has been largely replaced by 'convention', but there is still a political and campaigning side to the event. In recent years the momentum behind the event has spawned a number of offshoots, such as BiFest, BabyBiCon, and the bi academic conference BiReCon, which have expanded on particular areas covered by BiCon.

In 2002 BiCon hosted the first Cake Awards recognising the breadth of contributions made to the bisexual community in the UK. Further Cake Awards have been presented at BiCon every few years since.

In the Netherlands, Holland BiCon was inspired by UK BiCon, and has run annually since 2009. BICON has been a registered trade mark of BiCon Continuity Ltd since 2016.

== Past events ==
Name	Dates	Venue	City	Attendance	Residential?
The Politics of Bisexuality	8–9 December 1984	The Factory Community Project	London	40	No
2nd Politics of Bisexuality Conference	April 1985	London Lesbian and Gay Centre	London	50+	No
Bisexuality and the Politics of Sex	October 1985	The Pleasance Student Centre	Edinburgh	52	No
4th National Bisexual Conference	July 1986	The Mary Ward Centre, Bloomsbury	London	70	No
5th National Bisexual Conference	? 1987	The Pleasance Student Centre	Edinburgh	119	No
6th National Bisexual Conference	October 1988	Friends Meeting House, Hampstead,	London	154	No
BiCon 7: The 7th National Bisexual Conference	26–30 August 1989	Coventry Polytechnic (now Coventry University)	Coventry	200-?	Yes
8th National Bisexual Conference	7–10 September 1990	Tollcross Community Centre	Edinburgh	200+	No
9th National Bisexual Conference	20–22 September 1991	University of London Union	London	240+	No
BiCon 10	26–30 August 1992	University of East Anglia	Norwich	200	Yes
BiCon 11	1–3 October 1993	Derby Hall, University of Nottingham	Nottingham	250+	Yes
BiCon 12	3–6 August 1994	Methodist Central Hall	Edinburgh	~200	No
13iCon	1–3 September 1995	University of Central England	Birmingham	245	Yes
BiCon 14	30 August – 1 September 1996	Kingston University, Kingston upon Thames	London	250	Yes
BiCon 97 / BiCon 15	28–31 August 1997	University of Greenwich, Woolwich	London	180	Yes
BiCon 98 / BiCon 16	4–6 September 1998	New Hall, Cambridge	Cambridge	?	Yes
BiCon 1999 / BiCon 17	16–18 July 1999	Pollock Halls, University of Edinburgh	Edinburgh	201	Yes
BiCon 2000 / BiCon 18 (incorporating the 6th ICB)	24–28 August 2000	Owens Park Campus, University of Manchester	Manchester	265	Yes
BiCon 2001	24–27 August 2001	Singer Hall and main campus, Coventry University	Coventry	169	Yes
BiCon 2002	16–18 August 2002	College Hall, University of Leicester	Leicester	189	Yes
BiCon 2003	22–25 August 2003	Docklands Campus, University of East London	London	237	Yes
BiCon 2004	26–30 August 2004	Fallowfield Campus, University of Manchester	Manchester	273	Yes
BiCon 2005	25–29 August 2005	University College Worcester	Worcester	(+170)	Yes
BiCon 2006	13–17 July 2006	Glasgow Caledonian University	Glasgow	200	Yes
BiCon 2007	16–20 August 2007	Trefforest Campus, University of Glamorgan	Pontypridd, nr Cardiff	246	Yes
BiCon 2008	28–31 August 2008	Gilbert Murray Hall, University of Leicester	Leicester	250	Yes
BiCon 2009	20–23 August 2009	St. John's Campus, University of Worcester	Worcester	~235	Yes
BiCon 2010 & the 10th ICB	26–30 August 2010	Docklands Campus, University of East London	London	~460	Yes
Bicon 2011	1–4 September 2011	Stamford Hall, University of Leicester	Leicester	297	Yes
Bicon 2012	9–13 August 2012	University of Bradford	Bradford	300	Yes
Bicon 2013	18–21 July 2013	University of Edinburgh	Edinburgh	311	Yes
BiCon 2014	31 July – 3 August 2014	Leeds Trinity University	Leeds		Yes
BiCon 2015	13–16 August 2015	University of Nottingham	Nottingham	437	Yes
BiCon 2016	4–7 August 2016	University of Central Lancashire	Preston	304	Yes
BiCon 2017	10–13 August 2017	Leeds Beckett University, Headingley Campus	Leeds	375	Yes
BiCon 2018	2–5 August 2018	University of Salford	Salford	265	Yes
BiCon 2019	1–4 August 2019	University of Lancaster	Lancaster	280+	Yes
BiCon 2020	13–16 August 2020	Virtual event using Zoom & Discord	n/a	404	—N/a
BiCon 2021	19–22 August 2021	Virtual event using Zoom & Discord	n/a	?	—N/a
BiCon 2022	11–14 August 2022	Leeds Beckett University, Headingley Campus	Leeds	?	Yes
BiCon 2023	3–6 August 2023	Nottingham Trent University	Nottingham	?	Yes
BiCon 2024	30 November – 1 December 2024	Heartlands High School	London	111	No
BiCon 2025	25 July – 27 July 2024	Nottingham Girls' High School	Nottingham	?	No

== Future events ==
Name	Year	Dates	Venue	City
BiCon 2026	2026	21-23 August	Nottingham Girls' High School	Nottingham

== BabyBiCon ==
A spin-off event BabyBiCon aimed at bisexual youth (those under 26 years old) was held in Manchester on 5–7 June 1998. It was organised at the Ardwick Youth Club by the group BiYouth (which folded in 2000) with support from a couple of local lesbian and gay youth projects. While attracting around 25 people, discussions of holding successor events in 1999 and 2000 led to nothing.

== BiReCon ==
BiReCon is a research conference for academic work on bisexuality. BiReCon originated as a series of workshops at BiCon. Elizabeth Baxter-Williams came up with the name while on the organizing committee for the 2008 BiCon.

The first BiReCon was organized as a national conference to be held before BiCon 2008. It was held in 2008 at the University of Leicester. There were approximately 60 attendees.

In 2010, BiCon (UK) organized the 10th International Conference on Bisexuality (ICB). The organizers decided to make the second BiReCon an international conference. It took place on 26 August 2010, the day before ICB, at the University of East London. Speakers included Serena Anderlini-D'Onofrio, Eric Anderson, Robyn Ochs, and John Sylla. There were approximately 100 attendees.

The third BiReCon took place on 9 August 2012 at Bradford University and focused on mental health. Speakers included Meg-John Barker, Roshan das Nair, and Christina Richards. The fourth BiReCon focused on joining academics research and community-run bi groups, and it was held on 31 July 2014 at Leeds Trinity University.

The fifth BiReCon, EuroBiReCon, was an international conference held on 28–29 July 2016 at the University of Amsterdam. The keynote speakers on the first day were Dr. Surya Monro and Dr. Alex Iantaffi. The second day included a workshop presented by Robyn Ochs, Meg-John Barker, and Maria Pallotta-Chiarolli.
