= Robyn Ochs =

American bisexual activist, professional speaker and workshop leader

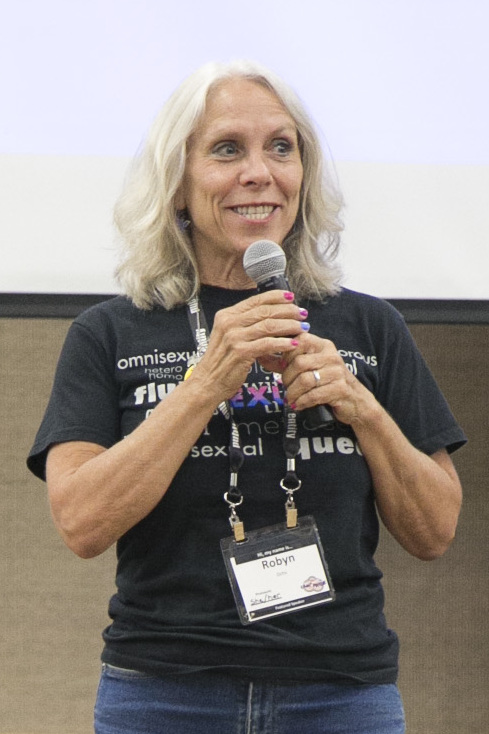
- Robyn Ochs in 2016
- Born: October 5, 1958 (age 68); San Antonio, Texas, U.S.
- Organization(s): Boston Bisexual Women's Network, Bisexual Resource Center, BiNet USA, MassEquality, Bi Women Quarterly, Inc.
- Movement: LGBT rights/bisexual rights
- Spouse: Peg Preble
- Mother: Sonny Ochs
- Relatives: Phil Ochs (uncle); Michael Ochs (uncle)
- Awards: Campus Pride's Voice & Action National Leadership Award (2017); PFLAG's Brenda Howard Award (2011); Susan J. Hyde Activism Award (2009); Harvard Gay & Lesbian Caucus's Lifetime Achievement Award for advocacy on the Harvard University Campus (2009); Reinaldo dos Santos Memorial Award for Bisexual Activism (1997)

Robyn Ochs (born 1958) is an American bisexual activist, professional speaker, and workshop leader. Her primary fields of interest are gender, sexuality, identity, and coalition building. She is the editor of the Bisexual Resource Guide (published annually from 1990 to 2002), Bi Women Quarterly, and the anthology Getting Bi: Voices of Bisexuals Around the World. Ochs, along with Professor Herukhuti, co-edited the anthology Recognize: The Voices of Bisexual Men.

Ochs has appeared on a number of television talk shows, including Donahue, Rolanda, Maury Povich, Women Aloud, Real Personal, Hour Magazine and The Shirley Show, to discuss issues relating to bisexuality. She has also been in Seventeen and Newsweek.

She describes herself as Jewish, but not religious.

== Education ==
Ochs has a Bachelor of Arts in Language and Culture, Latin American Studies from the State University of New York, Purchase. Additionally, she has a Certificate of Special Studies in Administration and Management and a Masters of Education from Harvard University.

== Work in academia ==
Ochs teaches courses on topics including LGBT history & politics in the United States, the politics of sexual orientation, and the experiences of those who transgress the binary categories of gay/straight, masculine/feminine, black/white and/or male/female. She has taught at the Massachusetts Institute of Technology, Johnson State College, and Tufts University.

Ochs worked as an administrator at Harvard University from 1983 until she retired in 2009. While there, she co-founded and co-chaired the LGBT Faculty and Staff Group, co-founded and facilitated the LGBTQ Lunches, a monthly lunch series for lesbian, bi, queer and trans women faculty and staff, and served as the faculty advisor for QSA, Harvard's undergraduate student LGBTQ organization.

== Work as a bisexual activist ==
Ochs helped found the Boston Bisexual Network in 1983, and the Bisexual Resource Center in 1985. In 1987, The East Coast Bisexual Network established the first Bisexual History Archives with Ochs' initial collection; archivist Clare Morton hosted researchers. The group became the Bisexual Resource Center in 1993.

In 2002 she delivered the first bi-focused keynote during the National Association of Lesbian and Gay Addiction Professionals. In 1998, 2004, and 2007, she keynoted the Midwest Gay Lesbian Bisexual Transgender Campus Conference, the largest gay, lesbian, bisexual and transgender student conference in the United States.

Ochs has served on the Board of Directors of MassEquality, Massachusetts's statewide equality organization, from 2004 to 2016.

She has written frequently on bisexuality and LGBT rights and her writings have been published in numerous bisexual, women's studies, multicultural and LGBT anthologies.

== Awards and recognitions ==
In 1997, she received the Reinaldo dos Santos Memorial Award for Bisexual Activism.

In 2009 at the Creating Change Conference, the National Gay & Lesbian Task Force awarded Ochs the Susan J. Hyde Activism Award for Longevity in the Movement. As she presented the award Creating Change Director Sue Hyde told Ochs: "We hear your clear voice, we see your staunch advocacy and we respond to your loving insistence that our movement includes all of us."

Also in 2009, Ochs received the Harvard Gay & Lesbian Caucus's Lifetime Achievement Award for advocacy on the Harvard University Campus.

Ochs received the 2011 Brenda Howard Award at the Queens NYC PFLAG chapter's annual awards luncheon on February 5, 2012.

On June 13, 2015, Ochs received the City of Cambridge's GLBT Commission's annual recognition award for her work as an educator and activist.

On July 22, 2017, Ochs received Campus Pride's Voice & Action National Leadership Award.

On October 16, 2024, Ochs was recognized as an LGBT History Month Icon.

== Personal life ==
On May 17, 2004, the first day it became legal for same-sex couples to marry in Massachusetts, Ochs and her long-time partner Peg Preble (a self-identified lesbian), were among the first same-sex couples to legally marry. When early news reports spoke of the marriage as a "lesbian wedding", Ochs objected strongly to being classified as a lesbian rather than a bisexual. In follow-up news coverage, Ochs publicly denounced this as an example of exactly the type of bisexual erasure she has been calling attention to for much of her life.

She is the daughter of music producer and radio host Sonny Ochs and niece of folk singer Phil Ochs.

== Selected bibliography ==
=== Books ===
- Getting Bi: Voices of Bisexuals Around the World, co-edited with Sarah E. Rowley (2005; second ed., 2009) (ISBN 0965388158)
- Recognize: The Voices of Bisexual Men – An Anthology co-edited with H. Sharif "Herukhuti" Williams (2014) (ISBN 0965388174)

=== Anthologies (as a contributor) ===
- "From the Closet to the Stage," in Bi Any Other Name: Bisexuals Speak Out, (Lani Kaʻahumanu & Loraine Hutchins, ed.) (1991) (ISBN 1626011990)
- "Bisexuality, Feminism, Men and Me," in Closer to Home: Bisexuality & Feminism (Weise, ed.) (1992) (ISBN 1878067176)
- "Moving Beyond Binary Thinking," (co-written with Marcia Deihl) in Homophobia: How We All Pay the Price (Blumenfeld, ed.) (1992) (ISBN 0807079197)
- "Biphobia," in Bisexuality: The Psychology and Politics of an Invisible Minority (Firestein, ed.) (1996) (ISBN 0803972741)
- Encyclopedia of Lesbian Histories and Cultures, Volume 1 (Zimmerman, ed.) (1999) (ISBN 0815319207)
- "What's in a Name? Why Women Embrace or Resist Bisexual Identity," in Becoming Visible: Counseling Bisexuals Across the Lifespan (Firestein, ed.) (2007) (ISBN 0231137249)
- "Bisexuality, Feminism, Men and Me," in Women: Images and Realities: A Multicultural Anthology (Kesselman, McNair, & Schniedewind, eds.) (2011) (ISBN 0073512311)
- "Beyond Binaries: Seeing Sexual Diversity in the Classroom," in Activities for Teaching Gender and Sexuality in the University Classroom (Murphy & Ribarsky, eds.) (2013) (ISBN 1475801807)
- “LGBTQ politics after marriage: a panel discussion with Gabriel Foster, Paulina Hehn-Hernandez, Robyn Ochs, Steven William Thrasher, Urvashi Vaid, and Hari Ziyad,” in Queer Activism After Marriage Equality (DeFilippis, Yarbrough, & Jones) (2018) (ISBN 9781138557505)
- “Without Wincing of Clenching: Bisexual People’s Experiences with Health Care Professionals,” in Bodies and Barriers: Queer Activists on Health, (Shanker, Kendell, & Levine)(2020)(ISBN 9781629637846)

== See also ==
- Bisexual Community
- Bisexual Resource Center
- Getting Bi: Voices of Bisexuals Around the World
