= Monosexuality =

Romantic or sexual attraction to members of one sex or gender only

Monosexual flag

Monosexuality is romantic or sexual attraction to members of one sex or gender only. A monosexual person may identify as heterosexual (straight) or homosexual (gay/lesbian). In discussions of sexual orientation, the term is chiefly used in contrast to asexuality and plurisexuality (bisexuality or pansexuality). It is sometimes considered derogatory or offensive by the people to whom it is applied, particularly gay men and lesbians. Some have used the term "monosexual privilege", arguing that biphobia is different from homophobia.

== See also ==
- Bisexual erasure
- Gynephilia and androphilia
- Monoromantic
