= Bisexual Awareness Week =

Annual observance, September 16–23

- Bisexual pride flag
- Official name: Bisexual Awareness Week, Bisexual+ Awareness Week, #BiWeek
- Observed by: Bisexual people along with their families, friends, allies and supporters
- Type: Cultural
- Date: September 16–23
- Duration: 8 days
- Frequency: Annual
- Related to: Celebrate Bisexuality Day, LGBTQ Pride

Bisexual Awareness Week, also known as Bisexual+ Awareness Week and #BiWeek, is an annual celebration held from September 16–23. It is an extension of Celebrate Bisexuality Day, held annually on September 23. The celebration promotes cultural acceptance of the bisexual community, as well as attempts to create a platform for advocating bisexual rights.

According to a 2013 Pew Research Center survey, bisexuals represent approximately 40% of the LGBTQ community. Bisexual Awareness Week is a platform to recognise bisexual and LGBTQ advocacy throughout history.

== History ==
Bisexual Awareness Week was co-founded by GLAAD and BiNet USA in 2014 to educate people on obstacles faced by the bisexual community, as well as to set policies that ensure bisexual acceptance and social integration.

== Goals and activities ==
According to co-founding organization GLAAD, the goals of Bisexual+ Awareness Week include accelerating acceptance of the bisexual+ community, drawing attention to the experiences of this community, and celebrating the resiliency of the community. Both allies and bisexual+ individuals are encouraged to spend the week learning about the "history, culture, community, and current policy priorities of bi+ communities". Bisexual+ Awareness Week can also potentially be an important opportunity for bisexual+ individuals to help fight feelings of isolation, create more visibility for others who may be exploring their sexuality, meet other bisexual+ people, and become an integral member of the bisexual+ community by coming out or sharing their personal experiences.

== See also ==
- List of LGBT events
- List of LGBTIQ+ awareness periods
