= Polysexuality =

Sexual orientation characterised by sexual attraction to many but not all genders

- Parent category: Plurisexuality

Flag
- {{{flag_name}}} Polysexual flag

Polysexuality is a sexual orientation characterised by sexual attraction to many genders, but not necessarily all. Polyromantic is the romantic equivalent.

== History of the term ==
The term, akin to most sexual orientations, derives its prefix from Ancient Greek; the prefix poly- means many. The term was first used during the 1920s. The term was added to Dictionary.com on 1 March 2018.

== Comparisons ==
This sexual orientation has been compared to other forms of multisexuality, such as bisexuality and pansexuality. Bisexuality is defined as being attracted to two or more genders, with individual definitions varying from person to person. Pansexuality means the sexual attraction to all genders. This is different from polysexuality due to polysexual people not always being attracted to all genders and gender can play a factor in their sexual attraction, though not always. Some choose to use polysexuality, bisexuality and pansexuality interchangeably since these terms describe people who are attracted to more than one gender. Others may choose to label themselves as polysexual rather than bisexual due to bisexuality sometimes being perceived to be associated with a strict gender binary, while polysexuality is not.

Polysexuality is sometimes confused with polyamory, which is the practice of dating multiple people; polysexuality is a sexual orientation, while polyamory is a relationship style.

== Flag and symbols ==
The polysexual flag was designed in 2012 by Tumblr user Samlin. The flag uses pink for attraction to women, green for attraction to non-binary people and blue for attraction to men.
