= Sexual fluidity =

Changes in sexuality or sexual identity

Sexual fluidity is one or more changes in sexuality or sexual identity (sometimes known as sexual orientation identity). Sexual orientation is stable for the vast majority of people, but some research indicates that some people may experience change in their sexual orientation, and this is more likely for women than men. There is no scientific evidence that sexual orientation can be changed through psychotherapy. Sexual identity can change throughout an individual's life, and does not have to align with biological sex, sexual behavior, or actual sexual orientation.

According to scientific consensus, sexual orientation is not a choice. Although no single theory on the cause of sexual orientation has yet gained widespread support, scientists favor biological theories, especially for explaining male sexual orientation. Research over several decades has demonstrated that sexual orientation can be at any point along a continuum, from exclusive attraction to the opposite sex to exclusive attraction to the same sex.

Use of the term sexual fluidity has been attributed to psychologist Lisa M. Diamond, who observed that many women's attractions towards women and men changed over time, although changes were modest (1 Kinsey scale point, on average). The results of a large-scale, longitudinal study by Savin-Williams, Joyner, and Rieger (2012) indicated that stability of sexual orientation identity over a six-year period was more common than change, and that stability was greatest among men and those identifying as heterosexual. While stability is more common than change, change in sexual orientation identity does occur and the vast majority of research indicates that female sexuality is more fluid than male sexuality. This could be attributed to females' higher erotic plasticity or to sociocultural factors that socialize women to be more open to change. Due to the gender differences in the stability of sexual orientation identity, male and female sexuality may not function via the same mechanisms. Researchers continue to analyze sexual fluidity to better determine its relationship to sexual orientation subgroups (i.e., bisexual, lesbian, gay, etc.).

== Background ==
Often, sexual orientation and sexual identity are not distinguished, which can impact accurately assessing sexual identity and whether or not sexual orientation is able to change; sexual orientation identity can change throughout an individual's life, and may or may not align with biological sex, sexual behavior or actual sexual orientation. While the Centre for Addiction and Mental Health and American Psychiatric Association state that sexual orientation is innate, continuous or fixed throughout their lives for some people, but is fluid or changes over time for others, the American Psychological Association distinguishes between sexual orientation (an innate attraction) and sexual orientation identity (which may change at any point in a person's life). Scientists and mental health professionals generally do not believe that sexual orientation is a choice.

The American Psychological Association states that "sexual orientation is not a choice that can be changed at will, and that sexual orientation is most likely the result of a complex interaction of environmental, cognitive and biological factors...is shaped at an early age...[and evidence suggests] biological, including genetic or inborn hormonal factors, play a significant role in a person's sexuality." They say that "sexual orientation identity—not sexual orientation—appears to change via psychotherapy, support groups, and life events." The American Psychiatric Association says individuals may "become aware at different points in their lives that they are heterosexual, gay, lesbian, or bisexual" and "opposes any psychiatric treatment, such as 'reparative' or 'conversion' therapy, which is based upon the assumption that homosexuality per se is a mental disorder, or based upon a prior assumption that the patient should change his/her homosexual orientation". They do, however, encourage gay affirmative psychotherapy.

In the first decade of the 2000s, psychologist Lisa M. Diamond studied 80 non-heterosexual women over several years. She found that, in this group, changes in sexual identity were common, although they were typically between adjacent identity categories (such as lesbian and bisexual). Some change in self-reported sexual feeling occurred among many of the women, but it was small, only averaging about 1 point on the Kinsey scale on average. The range of these women's potential attractions was limited by their sexual orientations, but sexual fluidity permitted movement within that range.

In her book Sexual Fluidity, which was awarded with the 2009 Lesbian, Gay, Bisexual, and Transgender Issues Distinguished Book Award by Division 44 of the American Psychological Association, Diamond speaks of female sexuality and trying to go beyond the language of "phases" and "denial", arguing that traditional labels for sexual desire are inadequate. For some of 100 non-heterosexual women she followed in her study over a period of 10 years, the word bisexual did not truly express the versatile nature of their sexuality. Diamond calls "for an expanded understanding of same-sex sexuality."

Diamond, when reviewing research on lesbian and bisexual women's sexual identities, stated that studies find "change and fluidity in same-sex sexuality that contradict conventional models of sexual orientation as a fixed and uniformly early-developing trait." She suggested that sexual orientation is a phenomenon more connected with female non-heterosexual sexuality, stating, "whereas sexual orientation in men appears to operate as a stable erotic 'compass' reliably channeling sexual arousal and motivation toward one gender or the other, sexual orientation in women does not appear to function in this fashion... As a result of these phenomena, women's same-sex sexuality expresses itself differently from men's same-sex sexuality at every stage of the life course."

== Biology and stability ==
Conversion therapy (attempts to change sexual orientation) is rarely successful. In Maccio's (2011) review of sexual reorientation therapy attempts, she lists two studies that claim to have successfully converted gay men and lesbians to heterosexuals and four that demonstrate the contrary. She sought to settle the debate using a sample that was not recruited from religious organizations. The study consisted of 37 former conversion therapy participants (62.2% were male) from various cultural and religious backgrounds who currently or previously identified as lesbian, gay, or bisexual. The results indicated that there were no statistically significant shifts in sexual orientation from pre- to post-treatment. In follow-up sessions, the few changes in sexual orientation that did occur following therapy did not last. This study stands as support for the biological origin of sexual orientation, but the largely male sample population confounds the findings.

Further support for the biological origin of sexual orientation is that gender atypical behavior in childhood (e.g., a young boy playing with dolls) appears to predict homosexuality in adulthood (see childhood gender nonconformity). A longitudinal study by Drummond et al. (2008) looked at young girls with gender dysphoria (a significant example of gender atypical behavior) and found that the majority of these girls grew up to identify as bisexual or lesbian. Many retrospective studies looking at childhood behavior are criticized for potential memory errors; so a study by Rieger, Linsenmeier, Gygax, & Bailey (2008) used home videos to investigate the relationship between childhood behaviors and adult sexual orientation. The results of this study support biological causation, but an understanding of how cultural assumptions about sexuality can affect sexual identity formation is also considered.

There is strong evidence for a relationship between fraternal birth order and male sexual orientation, and there has been biological research done to investigate potential biological determinants of sexual orientation in men and women. One theory is the second to fourth finger ratio (2D:4D) theory. Some studies have discovered that heterosexual women had higher 2D:4D ratios than did lesbian women but the difference was not found between heterosexual and gay men. Similarly, a study has shown that homosexual men have a sexually dimorphic nucleus in the anterior hypothalamus that is the size of females'. Twin and family studies have also found a genetic influence.

== Changes in sexuality ==
=== Demographics ===
One study by Steven E. Mock and Richard P. Eibach from 2011 shows 2% of 2,560 adult participants included in National Survey of Midlife Development in the United States reported change of sexual orientation identities after a 10-year period: 0.78% of male and 1.36% of female persons that identified themselves to be heterosexuals at the beginning of the 10-year period, as well as 63.6% of lesbians, 64.7% of bisexual females, 9.52% of gay males, and 47% of bisexual males. According to the study, "this pattern was consistent with the hypothesis that heterosexuality is a more stable sexual orientation identity, perhaps because of its normative status. However, male homosexual identity, although less stable than heterosexual identity, was relatively stable compared to the other sexual minority identities". Having only adults included in the examined group, they did not find the differences in fluidity which were affected by age of the participants. However, they stated that "research on attitude stability and change suggests most change occurs in adolescence and young adulthood (Alwin & Krosnick, 1991; Krosnick & Alwin, 1989), which could explain the diminished impact of age after that point".

==== Males versus females ====
Research generally indicates that while the vast majority of men and women are stable and unchanging in their orientation and identity; when it comes to those who are fluid, female sexuality is more fluid than male sexuality. In a seminal review of the sexual orientation literature, stimulated by the findings that the 1970s sexual revolution affected female sexuality more so than male sexuality, research by Baumeister et al. indicated that when compared to males, females have lower concordance between sexual attitudes and behaviors, and sociocultural factors affect female sexuality to a greater degree; it also found that personal change in sexuality is more common for females compared to males. Female sexuality (lesbian and heterosexual) changes significantly more than males on both dimensional and categorical measures of sexual orientation. Furthermore, the majority of homosexual women who previously identified as a different sexual orientation identified as heterosexual; whereas for males, the majority previously identified as bisexual, which the authors believe support the idea of greater fluidity in female sexuality. Females also report having identified with more than one sexual orientation, more often than males and are found to have higher levels of sexual orientation mobility. Females also report being bisexual or unsure of their sexuality more often than males, who more commonly report being exclusively gay or heterosexual. Over a six-year period, women have also been found to display more shifts in sexual orientation identity and were more likely to define their sexual orientation with non-exclusive terms.

The social constructivist view suggests that sexual desire is a product of cultural and psychosocial processes and that men and women are socialized differently. This difference in socialization can explain differences in sexual desire and stability of sexual orientation. Male sexuality is centered around physical factors, whereas female sexuality is centered around sociocultural factors, making female sexuality inherently more open to change. The greater effect on female sexuality in 1970s sexual revolution shows that female shifts in sexual orientation identity may be due to greater exposure to moderating factors (such as the media). In western culture, women are also expected to be more emotionally expressive and intimate towards both males and females. This socialization is a plausible cause of greater female sexual fluidity.

An evolutionary psychology hypothesis proposes that bisexuality enables women to reduce conflict with other women, by promoting each other's mothering contributions, thus ensuring their reproductive success. According to this view, women are capable of forming romantic bonds with both sexes and sexual fluidity may be explained as a reproductive strategy that ensures the survival of offspring.

A longitudinal study concluded that stability of sexual orientation was more common than change. Gender differences in the stability of sexual orientation may vary by subgroup and could possibly be related to individual differences more than gender-wide characteristics.

==== Youth (age 14–21) ====
One study that did compare the stability of youth sexual orientation identity across genders found results opposite to most done with adult samples. The study compared non-heterosexual male and female sexual orientation over a year and concluded that female youth were more likely to report consistent sexual identities than males. The study was conducted over a single year.

Youth appears to be when most change in sexual orientation identity occurs for females. A 10-year study compared sexual orientation as measured at four times during the study. The most change was found between the first (taken at 18 years of age) and second (taken at 20 years of age) measurements, the only time bracket that fell during adolescence.

A population-based study conducted over 6 years found that nonheterosexual (gay/lesbian/bisexual) male and female participants were more likely to change sexual orientation identity than heterosexual participants. A yearlong study found that sexual identity was more stable for gay and lesbian youth participants when compared to bisexual participants.

The identity integration process that individuals go through during adolescence appears to be associated with changes in sexual identity; adolescents who score higher on identity integration measures are more consistent in their sexual orientation. Bisexual youths seem to take longer to form their sexual identities than do consistently homosexual or heterosexual identifying youths so bisexuality may be seen as a transitional phase during adolescence. Rosario et al. (2006) conclude that "acceptance, commitment, and integration of a gay/lesbian identity is an ongoing developmental process that, for many youths, may extend through adolescence and beyond."

Sabra L. Katz-Wise and Janet S. Hide report in article published 2014 in "Archives of Sexual Behavior" of their study on 188 female and male young adults in the United States with a same-gender orientation, aged 18–26 years. In that cohort, sexual fluidity in attractions was reported by 63% of females and 50% of males, with 48% of those females and 34% of those males reporting fluidity in sexual orientation identity.

=== Bisexuality as a transitional phase ===
Bisexuality as a transitional phase on the way to identifying as exclusively lesbian or gay has also been studied. In a large-scale, longitudinal study, participants who identified as bisexual at one point in time were especially likely to change sexual orientation identity throughout the six-year study. A second longitudinal study found conflicting results. If bisexuality is a transitional phase, as people grow older the number identifying as bisexual should decline. Over the 10-year span of this study (using a female-only sample), the overall number of individuals identifying as bisexual remained relatively constant (hovering between 50 and 60%), suggesting that bisexuality is a third orientation, distinct from homosexuality and heterosexuality and can be stable. A third longitudinal study by Kinnish, Strassberg, and Turner (2005) supports this theory. While sex differences in sexual orientation stability were found for heterosexuals and gays/lesbians, no sex difference was found for bisexual men and women.

== Society and culture ==
The exploration on sexual fluidity initiated by Lisa M. Diamond presented a cultural challenge to the LGBT community; this is because although researchers usually emphasize that changes in sexual orientation are unlikely, despite conversion therapy attempts, sexual identity can change over time. That sexual orientation is not always stable challenges the views of many within the LGBT community, who believe that sexual orientation is fixed and immutable.

There is some level of cultural debate regarding the question of how (and if) fluidity exists among men, including questions regarding fluctuations in attractions and arousal in male bisexuals.

Sexual fluidity may overlap with abrosexuality, which has been used to refer to regular changes in one's sexuality, though this may involve clear-cut shifts or phases in a slightly more rigid structure than "traditional" sexual fluidity. Bi-cycle is a slang term used amongst bisexuals to refer to the changes in attractions they feel towards certain genders.

== See also ==
- Bambi effect (slang)
- Bi-curious
- Biology and sexual orientation
- Environment and sexual orientation
- Pansexuality
- Questioning (sexuality and gender)
- Situational sexual behavior
- Unlabeled sexuality
