= Pansexuality =

Sexual attraction to people regardless of sex or gender identity

- Pronunciation: /ˌpænsɛkʃuˈælɪti/ PAN-sek-shoo-AL-it-ee
- Etymology: Ancient Greek: πᾶν, romanized: pân, meaning 'all'
- Definition: Sexual or romantic attraction to people regardless of gender
- Classification: Sexual identity
- Parent category: Plurisexuality

Other terms
- Associated terms: Bisexuality; polysexuality; queer; heteroflexibility; omnisexuality

Flag
- Pansexual flag
- Flag name: Pansexual flag
- Meaning: Magenta, yellow and cyan respectively representing attraction to women, non-binary people and men

Pansexuality is sexual, romantic, or emotional attraction towards people of all genders, or regardless of their sex or gender identity. Pansexual people may refer to themselves as gender-blind, asserting that gender and sex are not determining factors in their romantic or sexual attraction to others.

Pansexuality is sometimes considered a sexual orientation in its own right or, at other times, as a branch of bisexuality (since attraction to all genders falls under the category of attraction to people of the same gender and different genders) to indicate a lack of gender preference. While pansexual people are open to relationships with people who do not identify as strictly men or women, and pansexuality therefore explicitly rejects the gender binary in terms of the chosen etymology, this is by no means a feature which is exclusive to pansexuality and can also be found in broad definitions of homosexuality, bisexuality and the asexual spectrum.

== History and etymology ==
The prefix pan- comes from the Ancient Greek πᾶν (pan), meaning "all, every". Pansexuality is also sometimes called omnisexuality. Omnisexuality may be used to describe those "attracted to people of all genders across the gender spectrum", and pansexuality may be used to describe the same people, or those attracted to people "regardless of gender". Pansexuality and omnisexuality are sometimes considered synonymous, but when a distinction is made between them, the former term emphasizes gender blindness, while the latter emphasizes the role of gender in attraction.

In 1878, Machado de Assis, a renowned Brazilian writer of the 19th century, made one of the first known uses to date in Portuguese of the term omnisexual for his criticism of the novel O Primo de Basílio by Eça de Queirós. The review was published in the newspaper of the time, O Cruzeiro, which, on April 16, 1878, featured a review signed by Eleazar, the pseudonym of Machado de Assis, on the cover of the newspaper. De Assis classified the naturalism and lack of sexual filter present in the novel as "reminiscences and allusions of an eroticism that Proudhon would call omnisexual and omnimod".

Early individuals who displayed pansexual tendencies include John Wilmot and Friedrich Schiller. Although later attributed to Shulamith Firestone, the hybrid words pansexual and pansexualism were first attested in 1914 (spelled "pan-sexualism"), coined by opponents of Sigmund Freud to denote the idea "that the sex instinct plays the primary part in all human activity, mental and physical". (Note: Another early definition was "the pervasion of all conduct and experience with sexual emotions".) The term was translated to German as Pansexualismus in Freud's work Group Psychology and the Analysis of the Ego.

The word pansexual is attested as a term for a variety of attraction, alongside omnisexual (coming from the Latin omnis, "all") and the earlier bisexual, by the 1970s. Bi Any Other Name states that "pansexual people have been actively involved in the bisexual community since the 1970s." The term pansexuality emerged as a term for a sexual identity or sexual orientation in the 1990s, "to describe desires that already existed for many people". Social psychologist Nikki Hayfield states that the term saw early use in BDSM communities.

In 2010, the pansexual flag was posted on a Tumblr blog to represent the pansexual community. It was designed by Jasper Varney. The colors are intended to represent attraction and gender spectrum, with cyan for attraction to men, pink for attraction to women, and yellow for attraction to non-binary people.

Variations on the term pansexual are beginning to appear. For example, panqueer, a blend word of pansexual and queer, has been used by participants in a study on non-medical impacts of COVID-19.

== Comparison to bisexuality and other sexual identities ==
=== Definitions ===
A literal dictionary definition of bisexuality, due to the prefix "bi-", is sexual or romantic attraction to two sexes (males and females), to two genders (men and women), or attraction to both people of the same gender and different genders.

Pansexuality, however, composed with the prefix "pan-", is the sexual attraction to a person of any sex or gender. Using these definitions, pansexuality is defined differently by explicitly including people who are intersex or outside the gender binary.

Volume 2 of Cavendish's Sex and Society states that "although the term's literal meaning can be interpreted as 'attracted to everything', people who identify as pansexual do not usually include paraphilias, such as bestiality, pedophilia and necrophilia, in their definition", and that they "stress that the term 'pansexuality' describes only consensual adult sexual behaviors."

The definition of pansexuality can encourage the belief that it is the only sexual identity that covers individuals who do not cleanly fit into the categories of male or man, or female or woman. However, bisexual-identified people and scholars may object to the notion that bisexuality means sexual attraction to only two genders, arguing that since "bisexual" is not simply about attraction to two sexes and encompasses attraction to different genders as well, it includes attraction to more than two genders. Gender is considered more complex than the state of one's sex, as gender includes genetic, hormonal, environmental and social factors. Furthermore, the term "bisexual" is sometimes defined as the romantic or sexual attraction to multiple genders. The Bisexual Resource Center, for example, defines bisexuality as "an umbrella term for people who recognize and honor their potential for sexual and emotional attraction to more than one gender", while the American Institute of Bisexuality states that the term "bisexual" "is an open and inclusive term for many kinds of people with same-sex and different-sex attractions" and that "the scientific classification 'bisexual' only addresses the physical, biological sex of the people involved, not the gender-presentation."

Scholar Shiri Eisner states that terms such as "pansexual", "omnisexual", "polysexual", "queer", etc. are being used in place of the term "bisexual" because "bisexuality, it's been claimed, is a gender binary, and therefore oppressive, word" and that "the great debate is being perpetuated and developed by bisexual-identified transgender and genderqueer people on the one hand, and non-bi-identified transgender and genderqueer people on the other." Eisner argues that "the allegations of binarism have little to do with bisexuality's actual attributes or bisexual people's behavior in real life" and that the allegations are a political method to keep the bisexual and transgender movements separated, because of those who believe that bisexuality ignores or erases the visibility of transgender and genderqueer people.

The American Institute of Bisexuality argues that "terms like 'pansexual', 'polysexual', 'omnisexual', and 'ambisexual' also describe a person with homosexual and heterosexual attractions, and therefore people with those labels are also bisexual" and that "by replacing the prefix bi – (two, both) with pan- (all), poly- (many), omni- (all), ambi- (both, and implying ambiguity in this case), people who adopt these labels seek to clearly express the fact that gender does not factor into their own sexuality", but "this does not mean, however, that people who identify as bisexual are fixated on gender." The institute believes that the idea that identifying as bisexual reinforces a false gender binary "has its roots in the anti-science, anti-Enlightenment philosophy that has ironically found a home within many Queer Studies departments at universities across the Anglophone world", and that, "while it is true that our society's language and terminology do not necessarily reflect the full spectrum of human gender diversity, that is hardly the fault of people who choose to identify as bi. ... The Latin prefix bi- does indeed indicate two or both, however the 'both' indicated in the word bisexual are merely 'homosexual' (lit. same sex) and 'heterosexual' (lit. different sex)." The institute argues that heterosexuality and homosexuality, by contrast, "are defined by the boundary of two sexes/genders. Given those fundamental facts, any criticism of bisexuality as reinforcing a gender binary is misplaced. Over time, our society's concept of human sex and gender may well change."

==== Tensions with bisexuals ====
Bisexuals frequently struggle with myths and misconceptions about the definition of bisexuality, such as the idea that bisexuality conforms to the gender binary (thereby excluding attraction to non-binary individuals) or excludes attraction to trans people in general. This sometimes creates tension between bisexuals and pansexuals, as pansexuals often see themselves as being more inclusive to a wider array of genders. A 2022 study published in the Journal of Bisexuality suggests that the majority of women who identify as pansexual or queer defined bisexuality as limited to attraction to cisgender men and women and critiqued bisexuality as reinforcing the traditional gender binary. However, bisexual women defined bisexuality as attraction to two or more, or "similar or dissimilar", genders, described bisexuality as inclusive of attractions to all genders, and reported negative psychological outcomes as a result of the debate around bisexual gender inclusivity.

In another study, Ashley Green noted that pansexual participants sought to authenticate their identity as pansexual by juxtaposing it with bisexuality, often speaking of bisexuality as being inferior to pansexuality, most notably because they felt it excluded individuals who did not identify within the gender binary, some expressing very negative feelings toward bisexual individuals and positioning "pansexuality as being the superior identity as a result of its inclusivity, demonizing bisexual individuals as being transphobic if they do not identify as pansexual once they are informed that there is a 'better' identity". Green notes that this does not account for the large percentage of transgender and nonbinary individuals who also identify as bisexual, and characterizes these participants as contributing to a long history of biphobia. While some participants spoke favorably of bisexuality, describing the recognition of the validity of pansexuality as being contingent on the recognition of the validity of bisexuality, Green concludes by saying "In borrowing narratives that they are familiar with, the pansexual individuals interviewed in this study reinforced an essentialist understanding of identity despite their attempts to deconstruct gender binaries".

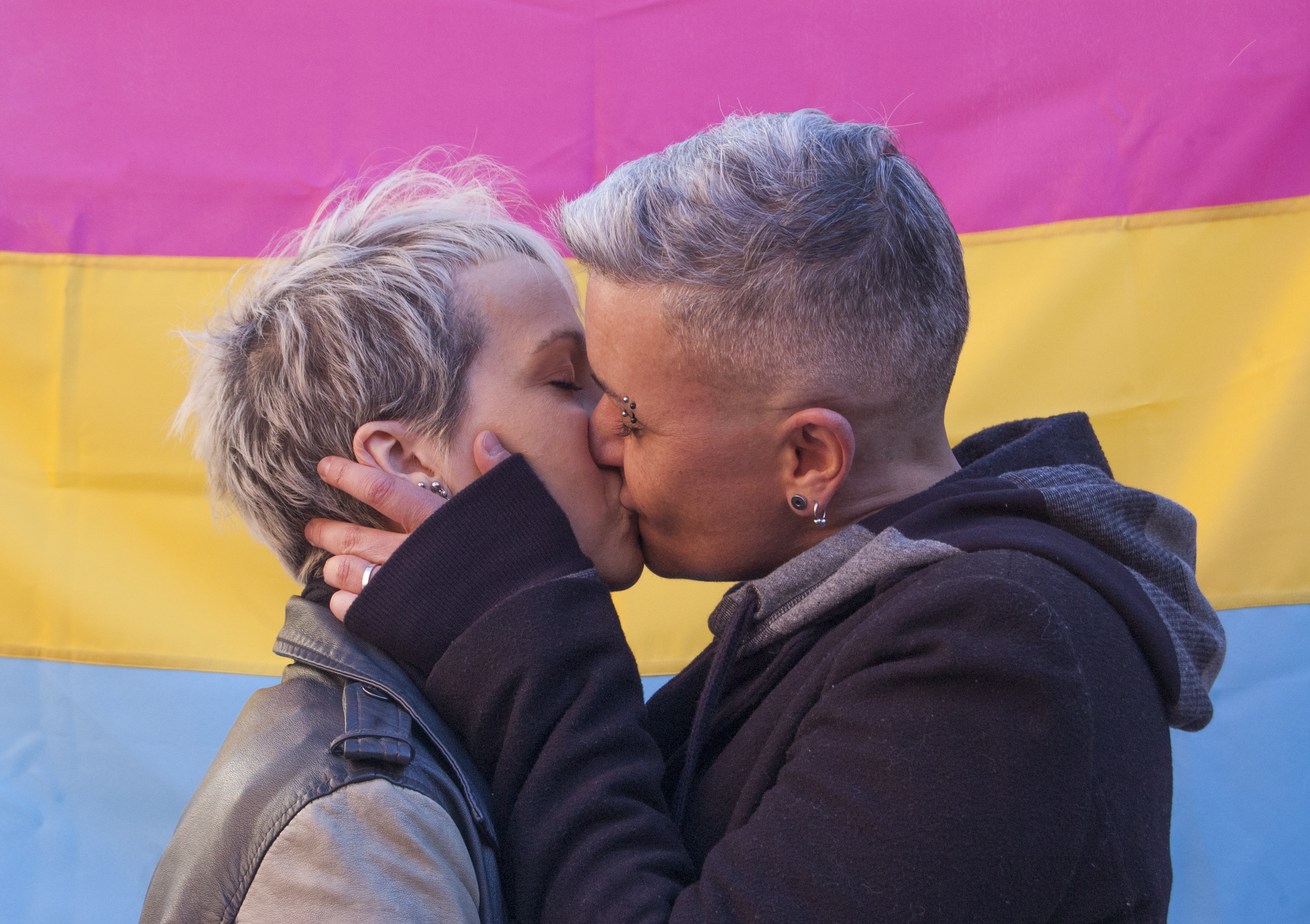
Couple kissing in front of a pansexual flag

A 2017 study published in the Journal of Bisexuality found that when bisexuals and pansexuals described gender and defined bisexuality, "there were no differences in how pansexual and bisexual people ... discussed sex or gender", and that the findings "do not support the stereotype that bisexual people endorse a binary view of gender while pansexual people do not."

=== Umbrella term ===
Social psychologist Corey Flanders said the "bisexual umbrella" is a term used to describe a range of sexual identities and communities that express attraction to multiple genders, often grouping those who identify as bisexual, pansexual, queer, and fluid, as well as other identities. The term faces issues of balancing inclusivity with cohesiveness, where, on one hand, the term can bring together many disparate identities and gather their experiences, and on the other, it can lead to too many sub-groupings and exclude those who identify with more than one sexual identity.

The term "pansexuality" is sometimes used interchangeably with "bisexuality", and, similarly, people who identify as bisexual may "feel that gender, biological sex, and sexual orientation should not be a focal point in potential [romantic/sexual] relationships." Additionally, "pansexuality" is often used in conjunction with "bisexuality", which can pose difficulties in studying differences and similarities in experiences between those who identify as pansexual and those who identify as bisexual and not pansexual. In one study analyzing sexual identities described as alternative terms for bisexual or bi-self labels, "half of all bisexual and bisexual-identified respondents also chose alternative self-labels such as 'queer', 'pansexual', 'pansensual', 'polyfidelitous', 'ambisexual', 'polysexual', or personalized identities such as 'byke' or 'biphilic'." In a 2017 study, identifying as pansexual was found to be "most appealing to nonheterosexual women and noncisgender individuals." Polysexuality is similar to pansexuality in definition, meaning "encompassing more than one sexuality", but not necessarily encompassing all sexualities. This is distinct from polyamory, which means more than one intimate relationship at the same time with the knowledge and consent of everyone involved.

Sexual fluidity is different from gender fluidity. Sexual fluidity is a concept that describes how a person's sexual identity may shift, and can shift at any time. The American Institute of Bisexuality stated that the term 'fluid' "expresses the fact that the balance of a person's homosexual and heterosexual attractions exists in a state of flux and changes over time."

Eisner states that "the idea of bisexuality as an umbrella term can emphasize a multiplicity of identities, forms of desire, lived experiences, and politics," and "resist a single standard" of defining bisexual-umbrella identities and communities, including pansexuality and pansexuals. Eisner also says that only those who want to be included under the bisexual umbrella should be included. The term "plurisexualities" is used by social psychologist Nikki Hayfield over bisexuality as an umbrella term "to capture additional identities relating to attraction to multiple genders", while also referring to specific identities like "bisexual", "asexual", and "pansexual".

In contrast to the idea of a bisexual umbrella, scholars Christopher Belous and Melissa Bauman propose that pansexuality might be considered more of an umbrella term than bisexuality, arguing that because pansexuality is often defined more broadly than bisexuality, bisexuality may exist under the umbrella of "pansexual orientations". They noted that more research is necessary to clarify which of the two terms might be more appropriate as an umbrella term. Scholar Emily Prior questions the use of bisexuality as an umbrella term, noting that "the empirical evidence just isn't there" to determine whether bisexuality can effectively act as an umbrella term. Social psychologist Joye Swan argues that including other orientations under the bisexual umbrella contributes to bisexual invisibility, invisibility for other sexualities, and presumes that "all or most bisexual people agree with being categorized" under the bisexual umbrella.

== Demographics ==
A 2016 Harris Poll survey of 2,000 US adults commissioned by GLAAD found that among 18-34 year-olds, about two percent self-identify as pansexual and approximately one percent in all other age groups. In 2017, 14% of a sample of 12,000 LGBTQ youth between 13 and 17 years of age declared themselves pansexual in a Human Rights Campaign/University of Connecticut survey.

One New Zealand 2019 study of a nationally representative group of bisexual and pansexual participants found that younger, gender-diverse, and Maori people were more likely to self-identify as pansexual compared to bisexual. The 2021 IPSOS survey found that the United States was the country with the highest percentage of pansexual individuals.

== See also ==
- Demisexuality – Only experiencing secondary sexual attraction
- Gender neutrality – Avoiding distinguishing based on gender
- Human sexuality – Form in which people experience and express themselves sexually
- List of pansexual people
- List of fictional pansexual characters
- Media portrayal of pansexuality
- Third gender – Gender identity as neither man nor woman
- Transcending Boundaries Conference
