= History of bisexuality =

Aspect of bisexuality history

The bisexual pride flag was designed in 1998 by Michael Page

The history of bisexuality concerns the history of the bisexual sexual orientation.

Although the term "bisexuality" was coined in the 20th century, there are recorded examples throughout history of people having both opposite-sex and same-sex relationships.

A modern definition of bisexuality began to take shape in the mid-19th century within three interconnected domains of knowledge: biology, psychology and sexuality. In modern Western culture, the term bisexual was first defined in a binary approach as a person with romantic or sexual attraction to both men and women. The term bisexual was redefined later in the 20th century as a person who is sexually and/or romantically attracted to both males and females, or as a person who is sexually and/or romantically attracted to people regardless of sex or gender identity, which is sometimes termed pansexuality. Some distinguish between bisexuality and pansexuality.

In English, the word "bisexual" was first used in 1892 by American neurologist Charles Gilbert Chaddock when he kept the term from the source material in his translation of the seventh edition of German psychologist Krafft-Ebing's book Psychopathia Sexualis. Richard von Krafft-Ebing was the first to use the word bisexual with the meaning of having both heterosexual and homosexual attractions or, in lay terms, attraction to both men and women. Prior to Krafft-Ebing, bisexual usually meant having both female and male parts as in hermaphroditic or monoicous plants, or in the sense of mixed-sex education, meaning inclusive of both males and females.

From the 1970s onwards, bisexuality as a distinct sexual orientation gained visibility in Western literature, academia and activism. Despite a wave of research and activism around bisexuality, bisexual people have often been marginalised in literature, film and research.

Societal attitudes towards bisexuality vary by culture and history; however, there is no substantial evidence that the rate of same-sex attraction has varied across time. Prior to the contemporary discussion of sexuality as a phenomenon associated with personal identity, ancient and medieval culture viewed bisexuality as the experience of homosexual and heterosexual relationships. The cultures of ancient Greece and Rome accepted that adult men were involved in homosexual relationships, as long as they took the active role of penetration.

== Ancient history ==
Ancient cultures and societies have conceptualised sexual desire and behaviour in a variety of ways throughout history, which are subject to debates. Many historians have pointed out the difficulty in identifying historical examples of queerness that have not been filtered through the lens of modern Western paradigms. Manuela L. Picq and Josi Tikuna wrote that "sexual diversity has historically been the norm, not the exception, among Indigenous peoples," pointing to the diversity of indigenous terms to refer to both sexual and gender identity, many of which do not translate well into contermporary English. Generally, homosexual relationships between men are more visible and recorded than those between women in literature and historical texts.

=== Ancient Greece ===
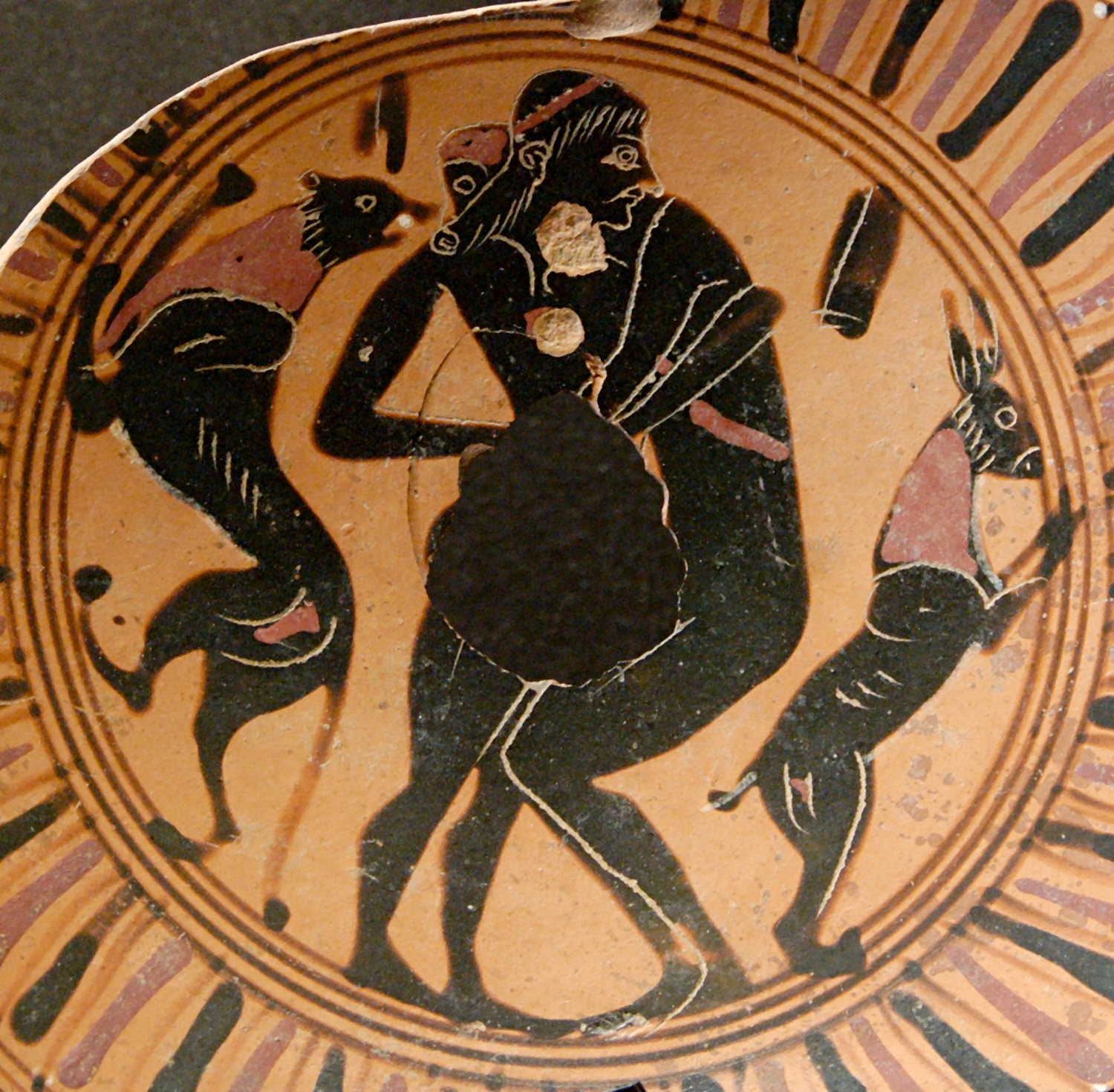
Young man and teenager engaging in intercrural sex, fragment of a black-figure Attic cup, 550 BC–525 BC, Louvre

The ancient Greeks did not conceive of sexual orientation as a social identity as modern Western societies have done, or distinguish sexual desire or behavior by the gender of the participants. The main distinction was in the role that each participant played in the sex act, that of active penetrator (typically associated with masculinity) or passive penetrated (typically associated with femininity). When intercourse occurred between two people of the same sex, it still was not entirely regarded as a homosexual union, given that one partner would have to take on a passive role, and would therefore no longer be considered a 'man' in terms of the sexual union. The active penetrator was typically associated with masculinity, while the passive penetrated was typically associated with femininity. However, for Plato, both men and women could be subjects or objects. For both philosophers, however, the male hierarchy is unquestioned.

The most common form of same-sex relationships between elite males in Greece was paiderastia (pederasty) – a relationship between an older male and an adolescent youth, rooted in tribal Greek tradition. The relationship often, but not always, included sexual activity. These relationships, though temporary, often had a lasting impact on future opposite-sex relationships; in ancient Spartan weddings, the bride had her hair cropped short and was dressed as a man. It was suggested by George Devereux that this was to make the husband's transition from homosexual to heterosexual relationships easier.

Historians debate over the acceptability of homosexual relations between adult men.

There are documented examples of prominent Ancient Greeks being involved in sexual relationships with both men and women. Alexander the Great, despite having multiple wives, was known to have an intense bond with his childhood friend Hephaestion that many modern scholars have speculated could have been sexual. Socrates, who married twice in his life and had multiple children, was described by multiple students as being unable to control himself around beautiful men. Some authors document a long-term romantic relationship between Theseus and Pirithous, despite the fact that both heroes were married to women.

Examples of same-sex relationships between women are less well-documented. Pedagogic erotic relationships are also documented fin ancient Sparta, where women would sing flirtatious hymns. Sappho, a poet who wrote extensive love poems about other women, is often stylized as a lesbian in modern pop culture, but in ancient times, she was portrayed having relationships with both men and women.

=== Ancient Rome ===
Latin, and Ancient Roman culture, did not have terms for "homosexual" or "heterosexual". Instead, the primary dichotomy of ancient Roman sexuality was active / dominant / masculine and passive / submissive / feminine. In Ancient Rome a freeborn Roman performing the penetrative role could have sex with male and female partners as it was considered socially acceptable; being penetrated was considered a form of submission, and a forfeiture of personal liberty. Acceptable male partners were slaves and former slaves, prostitutes, and entertainers, whose lifestyle placed them in the nebulous social realm of infamia, so they were excluded from the normal protections afforded to a citizen even if they were technically free. Freeborn male minors were off limits at certain periods in Rome. Having sex with another freeborn man himself was considered a violation of the other man's integrity, and immoral. Sexual use of another man's slave was subject to the owner's permission. However, love or desire between males is a very frequent theme in Roman literature. In the estimation of Amy Richlin, out of the poems preserved to this day, those addressed by men to boys are as common as those addressed to women. Homoerotic scenes between both male and female couples are depicted on everyday objects, and are often found to share space with pictures of opposite-sex couples. Some have interpreted this to mean that heterosexuality and homosexuality were viewed with equal value.

There are multiple words in Latin to describe sexual preferences that would today be labeled "bisexual": both cinaedus, and pathicus indicate a male who liked to receive anal sex by men and/or women; however, these were often used as derogatory terms.

Some Roman men kept a male concubine (concubinus, "one who lies with; a bed-mate") before they married a woman. Eva Cantarella has described this form of concubinage as "a stable sexual relationship, not exclusive but privileged". After marriage, the concubinus would remain in the household and might father children with women of the household.

Some prominent Roman men have been linked to relations with both men and women. Several ancient sources claim that the emperors Nero, Marc Antony, and Elagabalus (both of whom had multiple wives) had public marriage ceremonies with other men. Gaius Lucilius, a second-century BC poet, draws comparisons between anal sex with boys and vaginal sex with females; it is speculated that he may have written a whole chapter in one of his books with comparisons between lovers of both sexes, though nothing can be stated with certainty as what remains of his oeuvre are just fragments. Several prominent authors wrote comparing sex with men and women: including Ovid, Juvenal, Lucian, Strato, and Martial.

Same-sex relations among women are far less documented and, if Roman writers are to be trusted, female homoeroticism may have been very rare, to the point that Ovid, in the Augustine era describes it as "unheard-of". However, there is scattered evidence – for example, a couple of spells in the Greek Magical Papyri – which attests to the existence of individual women in Roman-ruled provinces in the later Imperial period who fell in love with members of the same sex.

Foursomes appear in Roman art, often with two men and two women, sometimes showing two same-sex pairings. In Pompeii, where there were found the only examples known so far of Roman art depicting sexual congress between women. A frieze at a brothel annexed to the Suburban Baths, in Pompeii, shows a bisexual threesome with two men and a woman, and a foursome with two men and two women participating in homosexual anal sex, heterosexual fellatio, and homosexual cunnilingus. However, this imagery runs counter to mainstream Roman culture, and at least one writer described the scene as humorous.

=== Ancient China ===
The concept of sexual identity was not present in ancient China before Westerners' introduction of the idea. Same-sex love can sometimes be difficult to differentiate in Classical Chinese because the pronouns he and she were not distinguished. And like many East and Southeast Asian languages, Chinese does not have grammatical gender. Nevertheless, there are ancient Chinese writings depicting same-sex relationships, particularly between upper-class people. People who engaged in sexual or romantic relationships with the same sex typically also often engage in heterosexual relationships. For example, emperors who have male concubines also have female concubines and offspring. These are often allusive and implied, using phrases and words only recognizable for people who are familiar with the literary culture and background. Words like "Long Yang (龙阳 lóngyáng)" and "male trend (男風; nánfēng)" are created to describe men who are engaged in a sexual or romantic relationship with men. Confucian ideology did emphasize male friendships, and Louis Crompton has argued that the "closeness of the master-disciple bond it fostered may have subtly facilitated homosexuality". But although women's same sex relationships are less recorded compared to men's, some researchers believe that societal attitude towards same sex relationship between women were more stable compared to that of men's.

Some historians have argued that under Confucian teachings favored what would be today referred to as "bisexuality" over homosexuality. Because not having children was one of the greatest sins against filial piety, procreational bisexuality could be tolerated, but exclusive homosexuality was not. Emperors were still obligated to marry women and raise heirs, and same-sex sexual activities and relationships were merely tolerated as secondary practices.

One prominent writing produced a word that still describes a same-sex relationship – Duànxiù, or "breaking the sleeve". The story describes a relationship between the Han Emperor Ai and his male lover Dong Xian (董賢). Emperor Ai was so devoted to his male lover that he attempted to pass the throne on to him. When Emperor Ai had to leave early in the morning, the Emperor carefully cut off his sleeve to not waken Dongxian, who had fallen asleep on top of it. However, critics have cited the fact that the relationship ended in tragedy and violence to argue that the story was therefore critical rather than supportive of same-sex relationships. People in China still imitate the cutting of sleeves to express their love for same sex lovers.

=== Ancient Japan ===
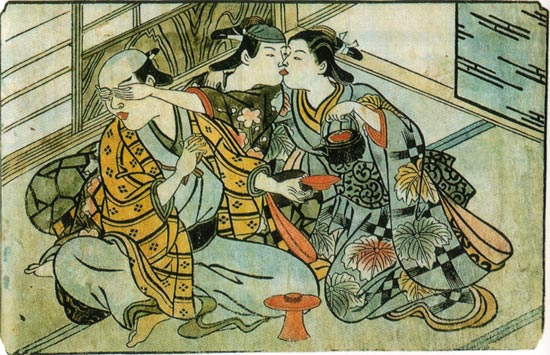
A wakashū (wearing headscarf) sneaks a kiss from a female prostitute behind his patron's back. Nishikawa Sukenobu, c. 1716–1735. Hand-colored shunga print.

The existence of men having sex with men in Japan has been documented since ancient times. There were few laws restricting sexual behaviors in Japan before the early modern period. Anal sodomy was prohibited by law in 1872, but the provision was not repealed until seven years later by the Penal Code of 1880 in accordance with the Napoleonic Code. Historical practices identified by research as homosexual include shudō (衆 道), wakashudō (若 衆 道) and nanshoku (男 色).

Several authors have noted a strong historical tradition of open bisexuality and homosexuality among male Buddhist institutions in Japan. Genshin, a Tendai priest criticised homosexuality in severe terms, but some interpreted his position as a condemnation of practices with an acolyte who was not under one's authority.

These practices are recounted in countless literary works, most of which have yet to be translated. English translations are available, however, for Ihara Saikaku, who featured a bisexual man in The Life of a Man in Love (1682), for Jippensha Ikku's account of the first gay relationship in the post-publication 'Preface' to Shank's Mare (1802 et seq), and Ueda Akinari's portrayal of a gay Buddhist monk in Tales of Moonlight and Rain (1776). Similarly, many of the greatest artists of the period, such as Hokusai and Hiroshige, took pride in documenting such love affairs in their prints, known as Ukiyo-e, pictures of the floating world, where they adopt an erotic tone, shunga or springtime pictures.

Nanshoku was not considered incompatible with heterosexuality; books of erotic prints dedicated to nanshoku often featured erotic images of young women (concubines, mekake or prostitutes, jōrō) as well as attractive teenagers (wakashū) and young cross-dressers (onnagata). Similarly, women were seen as particularly attracted to wakashū and onnagata, and it was assumed that these young men would return this interest. Nanshoku practitioners and the young men they desired would be considered bisexual in modern terminology.

== Pre-modern history ==
Due to the spread of compulsory heterosexuality and heteronormativity, bisexuality is often obscured throughout history. But there are documented examples of bisexual behavior throughout the pre-modern period.

=== Imperial China ===
Writings from the Liu Song dynasty claimed that same-sex relationships between married men were common in the late 3rd century, though these relationships often caused strain in marriages.

One of the most well-known ancient Chinese stories about same sex relationships is the story of "YuTao (余桃 yútáo)", the "leftover peach", as documented in the Intrigues of the Warring States. The book is a collection of political idioms and historical stories written by Han Fei (280–233 BC), a Chinese philosopher. Han Fei recorded this story between Mi Zixia (彌子瑕) and Duke Ling of Wei (衛靈公). His male lover Mi found a very sweet peach in the garden; after tasting it, he shared the remaining half with Emperor Ling.

As more Western and Central Asian visitors came to China during the Tang dynasty (618-907), China became increasingly influenced by the sexual moral conduct of foreigners. Male prostitution was forbidden during the Yuan dynasty (1271–1368), descended from the Mongol Empire) and the following Ming dynasty, and evidence suggests that there was a crackdown on homosexuality during this period as a continuation of the Mongol Empire's hostility to homosexuality.

There exists a dispute among sinologists as to when negative views of homosexual relationships became prevalent among the general Chinese population, with some scholars arguing that it was common by the time of the Ming dynasty, established in the 14th century, and others arguing that anti-gay attitudes became entrenched during the Westernization efforts of the late Qing dynasty and the early Republic of China in the 19th and 20th centuries. Ming dynasty China banned homosexual sodomy (anal sex) in the Ming Code since the Jiajing emperor's reign and continued into the Qing dynasty until 1907, when western influence led to the law being repealed.

In Ancient Fujian, the region had developed a sexual culture isolated from that of the rest of the Chinese empire. During the Qing dynasty, the local population began worshipping a Taoist deity known as Tu Er Shen, who served as the guardian of same-sex love. Hu was a human who had been executed after having been caught peeping on a nobleman he had become attracted to. He was originally destined to go to hell, but the guardians of the spirit realm took pity on him, as his crime was committed out of love.

But there are writings about female same-sex companions between Buddhist and Taoist nuns from this era.

Ming dynasty (1368–1644) literature, such as Bian Er Chai (弁而釵/弁而钗), portrays homosexual relationships between men as enjoyable relationships.

== Modern history ==
=== Pre-colonial Southeast Asia and Pacific ===
In Indonesia, the Serat Centhini records the prevalence of same-sex relationships in Javanese culture.

In Thailand, same-sex relations have been documented as early as the Ayutthaya period (1351 to 1767). Temple murals have been found which depict same-sex relations between men and between women. Concubines from the royal Thai family were known in the ‘Samutthakhot Kham Chan’ (สมุทรโฆษคำฉันท์), Thai literature from Ayuttaya times, to have lesbian relationships.

In the Philippines, same-sex marriage was documented as normalized as early as the 1500s through the Boxer Codex, while various texts have elaborated on the powerful roles gender non-conforming peoples had prior to Spanish colonization.

Same-sex relationships are documented as early as the 14th century in Vietnam.

Māori culture has a term, takatāpui, which was first recorded in writing by missionary Herbert Williams in 1832 with the definition "intimate companion of the same sex". Historians have noted that this does not explicitly identify the relationship as a sexual one. In the 1990s, the word was used in a report to the Public Health Commission to refer both to gay men and men who have sex with other men but do not identify as homosexual. (Today, the word is used as an umbrella term for LGBT people.)

=== Freudian theory ===
In 1905, Sigmund Freud presented his theory of psychosexual development in Three Essays on the Theory of Sexuality. In the book, he wished to demonstrate that bisexuality was the baseline sexual orientation for humans. Freud established his theory on a biological development basis that children in the pregenital phase do not differentiate between female and male sexes, but believe that both parents have the same reproductive powers and identical genitalia. When children reach the phallic stage, their gender identity becomes stable, and heterosexuality is the gradual result of the repression of an initial bisexuality. According to Freud, during the phallic stage, children develop an Oedipus complex where they have an unconscious sexual attraction for the parent of the opposite gender and feel jealousy towards the parent of the same gender. This situation transforms later into unconscious transference and conscious identification with the hated parent, providing a structural model which appeases sexual impulse towards the parent ascribed to the same sex by also provoking a fear of castration by the parent of the opposite sex to appease sexual impulses. Carl Jung criticized the notion of bisexuality lying at the basis for psychic life, and the fact that Freud did not according to him give an adequate description of the female child. In 1913 he proposed the Electra complex. Freud rejected this suggestion.

=== 19th century ===
Under British colonial rule, the British imposed its own anti-LGBT laws in territories it colonized.

According to Dutch anthropologist Gert Hekma, the term bisexual was used in Dutch for the first time in 1877, to refer to a hermaphrodite who had their sexual career as both a heterosexual woman and a heterosexual man. Later, the term bisexuality is used to represent both the double sexual-object choice and androgyny. Austrian-Hungarian writer Karl Maria Kertbeny coined the words homosexual and heterosexual in a pamphlet from 1869 in German, including the word Doppelsexualität (English: double sexuality) to describe bisexuality. Since the 19th century, bisexuality became a term with at least three different yet interconnected meanings. In the field of biology and anatomy, it referred to biological organisms that are sexually undifferentiated between male and female. By the early 20th century, in the field of psychology, bisexuality is used to describe a combination of masculinity and femininity in people psychologically instead of biologically. In the late 20th century, particularly since the AIDS epidemic, bisexuality is seen as sexual attraction to both male and female. Therefore, the contemporary history of bisexuality involved many intellectual, conceptual and sociocultural changes.

The first English-language use of the word "bisexual", in the sense of being sexually attracted to both women and men, was by the American neurologist Charles Gilbert Chaddock in his 1892 translation of the same term used in the same way in the 7th edition of Krafft-Ebing's seminal work Psychopathia Sexualis. Prior to Krafft-Ebing, "bisexual" was usually used to mean having both female and male parts as in hermaphroditic or monoicous plants, or to mean inclusive of both males and females as in the sense of mixed-sex education.

British physician Havelock Ellis and writer John Addington Symonds wrote one of the first Western textbooks about queerness called Sexual Inversions. First published in 1897, they would go on to re-publish several editions. The 1927 version of the book included positive representations of bisexual people.

=== Kinsey reports ===
In 1948, American biologist Alfred C. Kinsey, who was himself bisexual, published two books on human sexual behaviors, Sexual Behavior in the Human Male and Sexual Behavior in the Human Female, which are widely known as the "Kinsey reports". Kinsey and his team conducted 1,600 interviews with people about their sexual histories.

Kinsey rejected the notion of a clear-cut line between different sexualities. Instead of assigning people to different categories of sexualities, Kinsey and his colleagues developed a seven-level Kinsey scale. The scale considered people between K=1 and K=5 as "ambisexual" or "bisexual". According to the Kinsey Institute, the books Kinsey published sold nearly a million copies around the world and were influential in revolutionizing the public perception of sexuality.

Their research found that 11.6% of white males in United States (ages 20–35) had about equal heterosexual and homosexual experience/response throughout their adult lives, and that 7% of single females (ages 20–35) and 4% of previously married females (ages 20–35) had about equal heterosexual and homosexual experience/response for this period of their lives. As a result of this research, the earlier meanings of the word "bisexual" were largely displaced by the meaning of being attracted to both sexes. However, Kinsey himself disliked the use of the term bisexual to describe individuals who engage in sexual activity with both sexes, preferring to use "bisexual" in its original, biological sense as hermaphroditic, and saying, "Until it is demonstrated [that] taste in a sexual relation is dependent upon the individual containing within his [sic] anatomy both male and female structures, or male and female physiological capacities, it is unfortunate to call such individuals bisexual".

=== In the United States ===
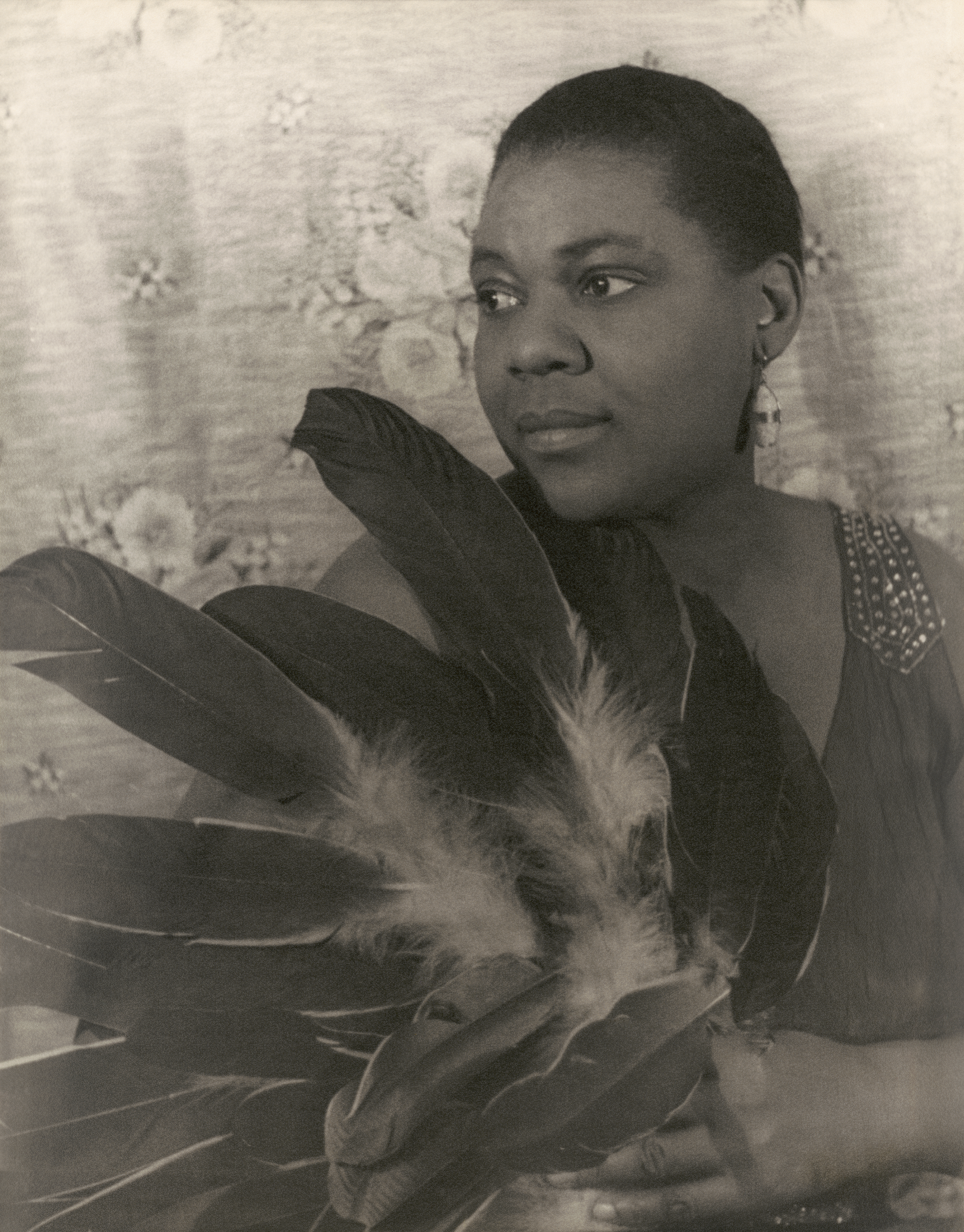
Blues singer Bessie Smith had relationships with both men and women (photo by Carl Van Vechten).

Under any label, openly bisexual people were rare in early American life. One notable exception was the openly bisexual poet Edna St. Vincent Millay, who received the Pulitzer Prize for Poetry for The Ballad of the Harp-Weaver in 1923. Furthermore, the poet Walt Whitman is usually described by biographers as either bisexual or homosexual in his feelings and attractions.

Early film, being a cutting-edge medium, also provided opportunity for bisexuality to be expressed. In 1914 the first documented appearance of bisexual characters (female and male) in an American motion picture occurred in A Florida Enchantment, by Sidney Drew. However, due to the censorship legally required by the Hays Code, the word bisexual could not be mentioned and almost no bisexual characters appeared in American film from 1934 until 1968.

==== 1960s ====
LGBT political activism became more prominent in this decade. The first public protests for equal rights for gay and lesbian people were staged at governmental offices and historic landmarks in New York, Philadelphia, and Washington, D.C., between 1965 and 1969. In D.C., protesters picketed in front of the White House, Pentagon, and the U.S. Civil Service Commission. Two of the protesters at the second White House picket, Judith "J.D." Kuch and Kris "Gene" Kleeberg, identified themselves as bisexual.

In 1966 the Student Homophile League at New York University and Columbia University was founded by Stephen Donaldson (aka Donny the Punk), a bisexual activist. Columbia University officially recognized this group in 1967 and it became the official first gay student group college in the United States to be officially recognized by a university. Activism on behalf of bisexuals in particular also began to grow, especially in San Francisco. Still in San Francisco, in 1967 Frank Esposito and Margo Rila founded one of the earliest organizations for bisexuals, the Sexual Freedom League.

In 1969 protests erupted during a police raid at the Stonewall bar. Police raids were frequent in gay bars, and people grew tired of being controlled and harassed by the police. The protesters were bar patrons and some of them were bisexuals. These events are known as The Stonewall Rebellion and are usually accepted as a milestone marking the beginning of the LGBT rights movement. In commemoration of this, the next year the first LGBT pride march was held. Brenda Howard, a bisexual activist coordinated the first LGBT Pride march and later became celebrated as the "Mother of Pride". She came up with the idea for organising events over one week around Pride Day which later generated the annual LGBT Pride celebrations that are now held around the world every June. Brenda Howard, with the bisexual activist Robert A. Martin (aka Donny the Punk) and gay activist L. Craig Schoonmaker were instrumental in disseminating the word "Pride" for these festivities. Tom Limoncelli, another bisexual activist, later said "The next time someone asks you why LGBT Pride marches exist or why [LGBT] Pride Month is June tell them 'A bisexual woman named Brenda Howard thought it should be.'"

==== 1970s ====
Bisexuals became more prominent in the media in the 1970s. In New York City, Don Fass founded the National Bisexual Liberation group in 1972, which issued The Bisexual Expression, most likely the earliest bisexual newsletter. In 1973 bisexual activist Woody Glenn was interviewed by a radio show of the National Organization for Women on WICC in Bridgeport, Connecticut. In 1974, both Newsweek and Time ran stories on "bisexual chic", bringing bisexuality to mainstream attention as never before. In 1976 the landmark book View from Another Closet: Exploring Bisexuality in Women, by Janet Bode, was published. In a September 1976 interview with Playboy, androgynous glam rock musician and pop star David Bowie discussed being bisexual; his wife, Angie Bowie, was also public in her assertions of her bisexuality during this time.

Bisexuals were also important contributors to the larger LGBT rights movement. In 1972, Bill Beasley, who was a bisexual activist in the Civil Rights Movement and well as the LGBT movement, organized the first Gay Pride March in Los Angeles. He was also active with the Gay Liberation Front. In Dade County, Florida, in 1977 the psychologist Alan Rockway, who was bisexual, was the co-author of a county ordinance that banned discrimination in areas of housing, employment, and public accommodation based on sexual orientation.It was the first LGBT rights ordinance to be voted and achieve success in America. Anita Bryant led an anti-gay campaign called Save Our Children against the ordinance, and Rockway began a boycott of Florida orange juice, which she advertised, in response. A press conference was organized in opposition to Bryant with Del Martin, Phyllis Lyon and Benjamin Spock by the San Francisco Bisexual Center. Also in 1979, Dr. Marvin Colter founded ARETE, a support and social group for bisexuals in Whittier, California, which marched in the 1983 Los Angeles Gay Pride Parade and had a newsletter.

The bisexual movement had its own successes as well. Most notably, in 1972 a Quaker group issued the "Ithaca Statement on Bisexuality" supporting bisexuals. The Statement, which may have been "the first public declaration of the bisexual movement" and "was certainly the first statement on bisexuality issued by an American religious assembly", appeared in the Quaker Friends Journal and The Advocate in 1972.

In 1976 the San Francisco Bisexual Center was founded by Maggi Rubenstein and Harriet Levi. The community center offered support and counselling to Bay Area bisexuals, and published a newsletter from 1976 to 1984, called The Bi Monthly. It was the longest surviving community center for bisexuals. In 1978, the Klein Sexual Orientation Grid was introduced by Fritz Klein in The Bisexual Option. Bisexual activism also began to spread beyond the coasts; from 1978 to 1979, several Midwestern bisexual groups were created: BI Women Welcome in Minneapolis, One To Five (by Gary Lingen and Scott Bartell for Minneapolis/St.Paul, Minn), BI Ways in Chicago, and The BI Married Men's Group in Detroit.

==== 1980s ====
In the 1980s AIDS began to affect the LGBT community, and bisexual people took an important role in combating it. San Francisco Mayor Dianne Feinstein appointed David Lourea to a role on her AIDS advisory committee, resulting in the inclusion of bisexual men in official AIDS statistics by the Department of Public Health in San Francisco. Health departments throughout the United States began to recognize bisexual men because of this, whereas before they had mostly only recognized gay men.

In 1981 the first bisexual group in the United Kingdom, London Bisexual Group, was founded.

The first American bisexual newsletter published at national scale was edited in 1988 by Gary North, and it was called Bisexuality: News, Views, and Networking. In 1989 Cliff Arnesen testified concerning bisexual, lesbian, and gay veterans' issues. He was the first veteran to do so on such issues as well as the first outed LGBT veteran to testify before the Congress about general issues concerning veterans. He testified on May 3, 1989, during formal hearings held before the U.S. House Committee on Veterans Affairs: Subcommittee on Oversight and Investigations. He also testified before the same Subcommittee on May 16, 1990, as part of an HIV/AIDS panel.

Bisexual people also continued to be active in the larger LGBT movement. The first BiCon UK (a get-together in the United Kingdom for bisexuals, allies and friends) was held in 1984. In 1986 in San Francisco Autumn Courtney (from BiPOL) became co-chair of Lesbian Gay Freedom Day Pride Parade Committee; she was the first openly bisexual person to be elected to this sort of position in the United States.

In 1987 75 bisexuals activists formed a group to march in the first ever nationwide bisexual gathering, the Second National March on Washington for Lesbian and Gay Rights. Lani Ka'ahumanu published an article for the march: "The Bisexual Movement: Are We Visible Yet?". It was the first article about bisexuals and the emerging bisexual movement to be published in a national lesbian or gay publication. The foundation of the North American Bisexual Network (NABN), was evoked during this gathering though not founded until three years later. It would later become BiNet USA. Also in 1987, Barney Frank became the first U.S. congressman to come out as gay of his own volition; he was inspired in part by the death of Stewart McKinney, a closeted bisexual Republican representative from Connecticut. Barney Frank revealed to The Washington Post that after McKinney's death there was a debate on whether he was LGBT or not and that he did not want this to happen to him.

==== 1990s ====
The oldest national bisexuality organization in the United States, BiNet USA (former NAMBN), was founded in 1990. It had its first meeting at the first National Bisexual Conference in America. This first conference was held in San Francisco, and sponsored by BiPOL. Bisexual health was included in the workshops at the conference, and the "NAMES Project" quilt included with bisexual quilt pieces. More than 450 people attended and the mayor of San Francisco declared that June 23, 1990, was the Bisexual Pride Day. The conference also inspired attendees to found the first bisexual group in their hometown, called BiNet Dallas.

The bisexual movement also became more accepted as part of established institutions. In 1990, Susan Carlton offered the first university course on bisexuality in America at UC Berkeley, and in 1991, Sari Dworkin and Ron Fox, two psychologists were the founding co-chairs of the Task Force on Bisexual Issues of Division 44 in the LGBT group of the American Psychological Association. In 1997, bisexual activist and psychologist Pat Ashbrook produced for the first time a national model for LGBT support groups within the Veterans Administration hospital.

Bisexual literature became more prominent in the 1990s. In 1991, the Bay Area Bisexual Network began publishing Anything That Moves: Beyond The Myths Of Bisexuality, founded by Karla Rossi, who was the managing editor of the editorial collective until 1993. It was the first national bisexual quarterly magazine.1991 also saw the publication of one of the seminal books in the history of the modern bisexual rights movement, Bi Any Other Name: Bisexual People Speak Out, an anthology edited by Loraine Hutchins and Lani Ka'ahumanu. After this anthology was forced to compete (and lost) in the Lambda Literary Awards under the category Lesbian Anthology, and in 2005, Directed by Desire: Collected Poems a posthumous collection of the bisexual Jamaican American writer June Jordan's work had to compete (and won) in the category "Lesbian Poetry", BiNet USA led the bisexual community in a multi-year campaign eventually resulting in the addition of a Bisexual category, starting with the 2006 Awards. In 1995, Harvard Shakespeare professor Marjorie Garber made the academic case for bisexuality with her book Vice Versa: Bisexuality and the Eroticism of Everyday Life, in which she argued that most people would be bisexual if not for "repression, religion, repugnance, denial, laziness, shyness, lack of opportunity, premature specialization, a failure of imagination, or a life already full to the brim with erotic experiences, albeit with only one person, or only one gender." Bi Community News began publishing as a monthly print journal in the UK in 1995. In 1997, bisexual activist Dr. Fritz Klein founded the first academic journal on bisexuality: Journal of Bisexuality. However, other media proved more mixed in terms of representing bisexuals. In 1990, a film with a relationship between two bisexual women, called Henry and June, became the first film to receive the NC-17 rating from the Motion Picture Association of America (MPAA). In 1993, bisexual activist Sheela Lambert wrote, produced, and hosted the first television series not only for bisexuals but made by bisexuals, called Bisexual Network.

Regional organizations in the bisexual movement also began to have more impact. Between 1992 and 1993 several "first" annual regional bisexual conference took place in Minnesota, Florida and Seattle: Bisexual Empowerment Conference: A Uniting, Supportive Experience (usually called BECAUSE) was the first in 1992, followed by First Annual Southeast Regional Bisexual Conference.

Minnesota also changed its State Civil Rights Law, obtaining the most progressive civil rights protections for LGBT people in the country. The bisexual community in Minnesota's lobbied with LGBT groups to obtain this. Also in 1992 the First Annual Southeast Regional Bisexual Conference was organized, then in 1993 the first Northwest regional conference in Seattle. In the UK, BiPhoria was formed in 1994, the oldest bi organisation in the UK today.

In 1993 the March on Washington for Lesbian, Gay and Bi Equal Rights and Liberation took place and is considered an important moment for bisexuality rights in the USA. As a result of lobbying by BiPOL (San Francisco), openly bisexual people took leadership roles in the local and regional organization, and the word "bisexual" was included in the name of the March for the first time. Lani Ka'ahumanu spoke at the rally, and over 1,000 people marched with the bisexual group. Coinciding with the March in Washington, DC, 600 people attended the Second National Conference Celebrating Bisexuality held with the help of the Alliance of Multicultural Bisexuals, BiNet USA, and the Bisexual Resource Center. It was the largest Bisexual Conference ever held at the time.

Several important surveys concerning bisexuality were conducted around this time. In 1993, Ron Fox wrote the first large scale academic study on bisexual identity, and maintained an exhaustive bibliography on bi research. Also in 1993, The Janus Report on Sexual Behavior showed that 5 percent of men and 3 percent of women considered themselves bisexual. In 1995 BiNet USA Bisexual Youth Initiative, Fayetteville, N.C., developed a national LGBT youth survey, which was published and sent to communities, to improve services to bisexual youth.

In 1992, Colorado voters approved by initiative an amendment to the Colorado state constitution (Amendment 2) that would have prevented any city, town, or county in the state from taking any legislative, executive, or judicial action to recognize bisexuals or gay people as a protected class.

This led to the 1996 Supreme Court Case Romer v. Evans, in which the Court ruled in a 6–3 decision that the state constitutional amendment in Colorado preventing protected status based upon bisexuality or homosexuality did not satisfy the Equal Protection Clause. The majority opinion in Romer stated that the amendment lacked "a rational relationship to legitimate state interests", and the dissent stated that the majority "evidently agrees that 'rational basis' the normal test for compliance with the Equal Protection Clause is the governing standard". The state constitutional amendment failed rational basis review.

The concept of bisexual pride became more widespread in the late 1990s. At an LGBT PrideFest in Connecticut in 1997, Evelyn Mantilla came out as America's first openly bisexual state official. The next year, the Bisexual Pride flag was designed by Michael Page (it was unveiled on December 5, 1998), and in 1999 the first Celebrate Bisexuality Day took place. It was organized by Gigi Raven Wilbur, Wendy Curry and Michael Page, and became an international event held every year on September 23.

== In France ==
In France, there is little research or documentation specifically related to bisexuality. One of the leading works is Catherine Deschamps' 2002 study entitled Le miroir bisexuel.

In 1995 a group of four women, including Catherine Deschamps, from the Act Up-Paris movement or from lesbian associations met at the Centre gay et lesbien (CGL) in Paris to work on an article on bisexuality for the newspaper Le 3 Keller. In the wake of this, they created a mixed group at the CGL, and in 1997 Bi'Cause, the first bisexual association in France, was founded from this group.

== In Switzerland ==
=== French-speaking Switzerland ===
In Switzerland, Stéphanie Pache founded Infobi – Antenne bisexuelle romande in Lausanne in 1997, the first bisexual association in French-speaking Switzerland. A feminist activist and involved in the LGBT movement, she was aware of her bisexuality and looked for resources and books on the issue in Switzerland, but found nothing except a book by sexologist Charlotte Wolff published in 1980. She founded a bi-group within the Vogay association, which was created on 1 July 1996 in Lausanne.

The association 360 in Geneva created in 1998 also responds to the need of LGBTIQ people with the wish to have a perspective of openness integrated in its statutes to tackle for the problem with a monolith perception of gay and lesbian identities. The newspaper 360° was created at the same time. Within this association, the bi discussion group was founded, which later became the Bipan group in 2021. The group organised its first public conference on 9 October 2013 entitled "Un soupçon de liberté: la bisexualité décomplexée" at the Maison des Associations in Geneva, inviting Karl Mengel, author of the book Pour et contre la bisexualité – Libre traité d'ambivalence érotique" published by Musardines in 2009.
