= Timeline of LGBTQ history in Manchester =

This is a timeline of notable events in the history of the lesbian, gay, bisexual, trans and queer community in Manchester, England.

== 19th century ==
- 1880
  - The Manchester City Police raid a fancy dress ball which was taking place at the Temperance Hall in Hulme. 47 men were arrested and charged with soliciting and inciting each other to commit "improper actions".

== 20th century ==
=== 1940s ===
- 1940s
  - 1941 – Napoleon's opens, and is now Manchester's oldest gay bar.

=== 1950s ===
- 1950s
  - The Union starts to attract an LGBTQ clientele following it hosting drag shows during World War II which had been popular with American troops stationed nearby.
- 1952
  - Alan Turing is prosecuted for being in a relationship with another man. He dies by suicide in 1954.

=== 1960s ===
- 1960s
  - Manchester's gay scene is based in an area between Albert Square and Deansgate with pubs such as the Rockingham and Rouge being popular although The Union continues to be frequented by the gay community.
- 1964
  - The North West Homosexual Law Reform Committee is founded by Labour councillor Allan Horsfall to campaign for the recommendations of The Wolfenden Report to be brought into law. The first meeting is held in Manchester. Three years later, the partial decriminalisation of sex between men over the age of 21 took place. The North West branch of the national Homosexual Law Reform Committee became the national Campaign for Homosexual Equality in 1969.
  - Rose Robertson sets up Parents Enquiry, the predecessor of FFLAG.

=== 1970s ===
- 1973
  - The Manchester Gay Alliance is formed by the University of Manchester's Lesbian & Gay Society, CHE, a lesbian group and transvestite transsexual group.
- 1975
  - 2 January – The Manchester Gay Alliance opens the Manchester Gay Switchboard to provide support and information to callers. It originally operated in the basement of the University of Manchester. After receiving a council grant in 1978, the scheme found a new home on Bloom Street. By 1990, the switchboard teamed up with The Lesbian Link Helpline to form the Manchester Lesbian and Gay Switchboard.
- 1978
  - The first edition of The Mancunian Gay Magazine is published.
  - Manchester's first designated ‘gay centre' opens in a basement on Oxford Road in 1978. It is used as a base for members of the Manchester Gay Alliance.

=== 1980s ===
- 1984
  - Manchester City Council forms the Equal Opportunities Committee. The numerous equality posts created included a Gay Men's Officer and a Lesbian Officer, first occupied by Paul Fairweather and Maggie Turner respectively.
- 1985
  - Manchester Pride is born following a £1,700 grant from the Manchester City council to put on a two-week celebration, complete with a huge banner adorning Oxford Street.
- 1986
  - Europe's first purpose-built Gay Centre built in Manchester when Manchester City Council approved funding of £118,000. The centre, on Sidney Street, is still serving the community today.
- 1987
  - Greater Manchester Police launches what will become the UK-wide Operation Spanner police investigation into same-sex male sadomasochism.

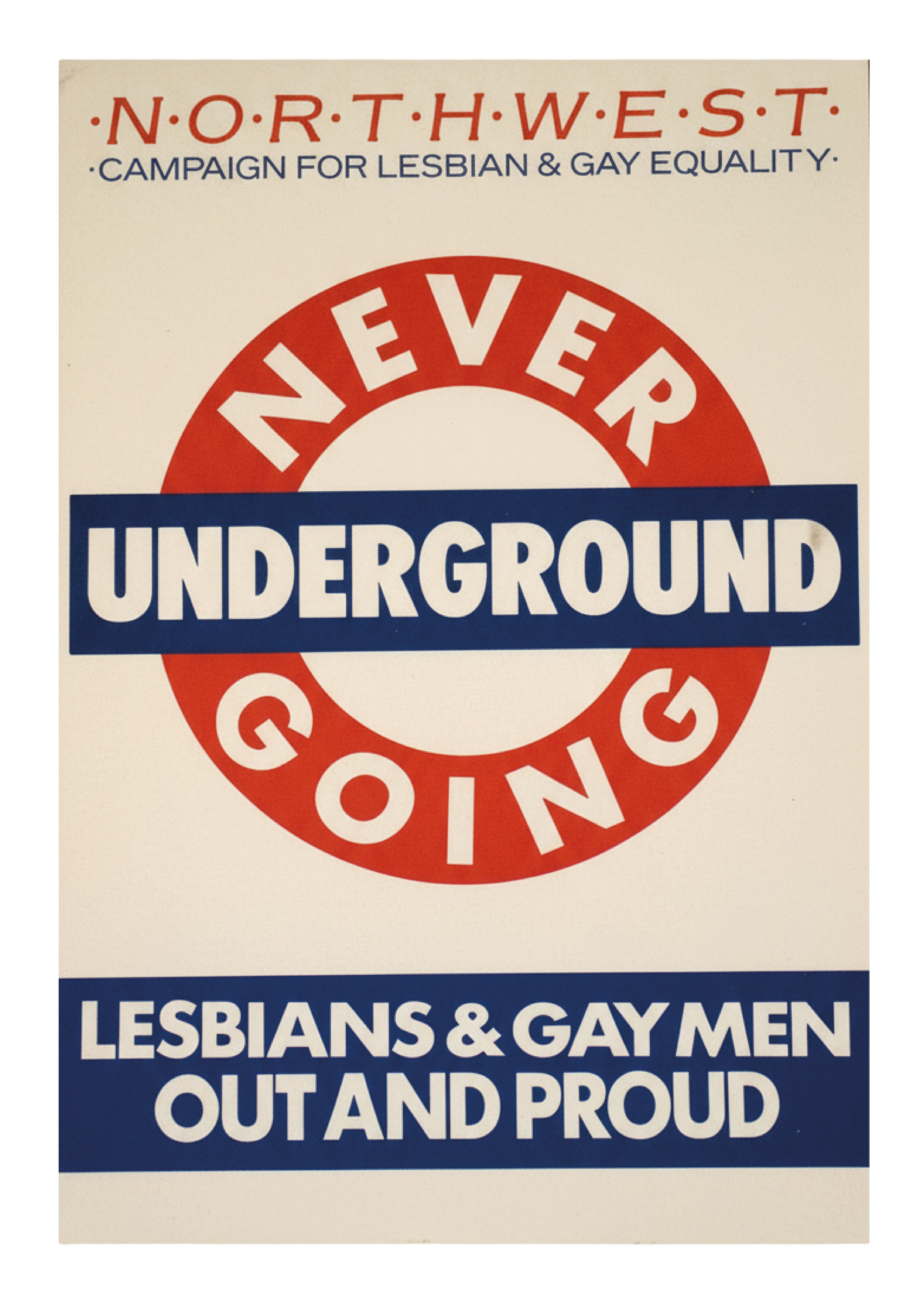
The Never Going Underground motif was developed by Ian Wilmott in 1987

- 1988
  - 20 February – The Northwest Campaign for Lesbian & Gay Equality organised a large anti-Section 28 march and rally in Manchester. The campaign adopted the name Never Going Underground, taking its title from an adapted roundel based on the London Underground logo, which served as both the campaign's defining visual and a statement of defiance. Organisers estimated that over 25,000 people took part, making it the largest lesbian and gay protest ever held in the United Kingdom. A rally in Albert Square, held in front of Manchester Town Hall, was welcomed by the city council leader Graham Stringer. Other notable speakers and supporters included Ian McKellen, Michael Cashman, and actors Sue Johnston and Ricky Tomlinson, both known for their roles in Brookside (TV series). In the evening, a Freedom Concert was held at Manchester's Free Trade Hall, featuring speeches, music and entertainment. Among the artists performing were Jimmy Somerville and Andy Bell.
  - After Section 28 became law in May 1988, Manchester City Council produced over 6,000 leaflets that set out how they aimed to prevent LGBT staff and service users from receiving unequal treatment within the law - despite the assumption that local authorities were not able to do this.
- 1989
  - The Northwest Campaign for Lesbian & Gay Equality went on to organises Manchester's "Celebration of Gay and Lesbian Diversity" Love Rights. It consists of a music festival at the Free Trade Hall and a political march starting at All Saints Park culminating in a rally with stalls in Albert Square. The main focus of the lesbian and gay rights movement at the time was opposing Section 28 and a series of unequal laws, differing age on consent and police harassment.

=== 1990s ===
- 1990
  - Manto opens as the first bar in the area not to be hidden away. Instead the front of the bar featured windows, allowing passers-by to see in. The building was the first in the area to be clad with large plate glass windows.
  - The Albert Kennedy Trust opens in Manchester to support young homeless LGBT people. The Trust is opened following the death the previous year (30 April 1989) of Albert Kennedy who died after falling from a car park roof in Manchester city centre, while being chased by several attackers in a car.
- 1991
  - The Village Charity is established and the Manchester Mardi Gras, 'The Festival of Fun', is launched. It raises £15,000 for Monsall Hospital - a local hospice where people received treatment for HIV and AIDS.
- 1992
  - 22 May – Nightclub Cruz 101 opens.
  - Families and Friends of Lesbians and Gays is launched.
- 1993
  - June – The Paradise Factory opens in the former Factory Records HQ. Although the venue was a gay nightclub first and foremost, many straight people also frequented the nightclub.
- 1994
  - Healthy Gay Manchester is formed.
  - 1 September – BiPhoria launches.
- 1995
  - The UK's first conference on policing LGBT communities "Police and Diversity: An Agenda for Change" is hosted by the Greater Manchester Lesbian and Gay Policing Initiative at Manchester Town Hall, attracting approximately 350 delegates.
  - Via Fossa opens its doors for the first time.
- 1996
  - The first Poptastic club night takes place in Manchester.
  - Velvet bar and restaurant opens. It comes to be seen as an early instigator of the Canal Street Society.
- 1998
  - The Bolton 7 are convicted of gross indecency. Their crime was having group sex, which was still illegal due to the partial decriminalisation of homosexuality which only allowed for two men to have sex together at an address when no-one else was at that same address. They later took their cases to the European Court of Human Rights, and reached settlements with the Home Office in 2001.
  - Manchester's gay and inclusive rugby union team Manchester Village Spartans is formed.
  - Bi Community News magazine moves to publishing in Manchester.
- 1999
  - 23 February – The first episode of Queer as Folk, a drama series based on Manchester's gay scene, is broadcast on Channel 4.
  - 23 September – The first Bi Visibility Day (known as International Celebrate Bisexuality Day at the time) is marked with a stall and social on Canal Street by BiPhoria, the only UK event to mark the date that year.

== 21st century ==
=== 2000s ===
- 2000
  - MAN Magazine is launched. The magazine looks at Manchester's gay lifestyle.
  - The Lesbian & Gay Foundation is formed following the merger of Healthy Gay Manchester and Manchester Lesbian & Gay Switchboard.
  - Mardi Gras is renamed Gayfest.
  - Essential nightclub opens.
- 2002
  - The Mardi Gras event is almost cancelled following a row between Greater Manchester Police and organisers over drinking bylaws and crowd safety. The event went ahead and attracted 100,000 visitors.
- 2003
  - Manchester hosts Europride and for the first time, the entire gay village area is gated off throughout the August bank holiday weekend with an entrance fee charged to get into the event. and at the final closing ceremony, it was announced that the event would now be known as "Manchester Pride".
- 2005
  - 10 June – The first Sparkle weekend for the trans community is held on Canal Street.
  - Manchester's gay and inclusive football team Village Manchester joins the GFSN National League.
- 2006
  - 14 August – Gaydio makes its first broadcast, transmitting for two weeks ahead of, and during, the 2006 Manchester Pride festival.
  - The Paradise Factory closes following the sale of the venue.

=== 2010s ===
- 2010
  - 18 June – Gaydio commences full-time broadcasting after being given a community licence by regulator Ofcom.
- 2012
  - 1–3 June – Manchester hosts the Bingham Cup, an international rugby union tournament featuring gay rugby union teams from across the world.
  - 31 December – Legends nightclub closes when the building which hosts it is demolished to make way for a hotel. In the past the venue had hosted the legendary Twisted Wheel Club. The demolition takes place despite attempts to impress on the City Council the venue's cultural importance.
- 2013
  - Manto closes its doors for the final time.
- 2015
  - April – The Lesbian & Gay Foundation changes its name to the LGBT Foundation.
- 2016
  - Carl Austin-Behan becomes Manchester's first openly gay Lord Mayor.
- 2019
  - August – For the first time, elements of the Manchester Pride four-day August bank holiday festival are held outside of the Village when the music stage is moved to the site of the former Manchester Mayfield railway station. 'The Big Weekend' has been replaced by a ticketed event for 2019, with an entry fee of £71.

=== 2020s ===
- 2022
  - Manchester Pride drops the concert element of the event. The change comes after a consultation with the LGBT+ community amid concerns about how the charity is run.
- 2025
  - October – The charity behind Manchester Pride goes into voluntary administration with considerable debts, saying that "a combination of rising costs, declining ticket sales and an ambitious refresh of the format aimed to challenge these issues has led to the organisation no longer being financially viable."
