= Florence Ashley =

Canadian academic and activist

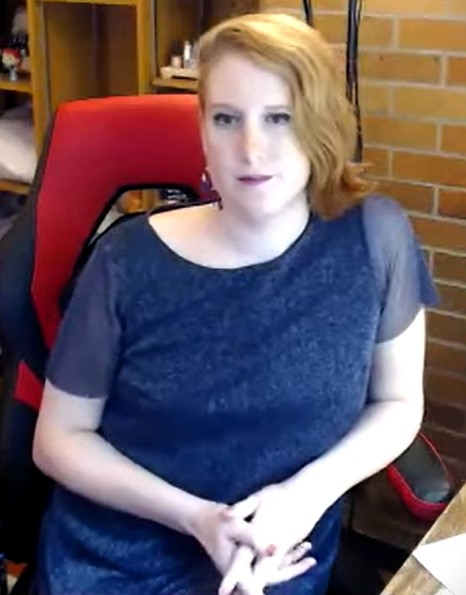
- Education: McGill University (BCL, LLB, LLM); University of Toronto (SJD)
- Occupations: Lawyer and Professor
- Employer: University of Alberta
- Title: Assistant professor

Florence Ashley is a Canadian academic, activist and law professor at the University of Alberta. They specialize in trans law and bioethics. Ashley is also the author of the book, Banning transgender conversion practices: a legal and policy analysis. Ashley served as the first openly transfeminine clerk at the Supreme Court of Canada. In 2022, Ashley was awarded the SOGIC Hero Award from the Canadian Bar Association.

== Personal life and education ==
Ashley came out as trans and transitioned in 2015. They use singular they pronouns. Ashley attended McGill University in Montreal, Canada, where they graduated with a Bachelor of Civil Law and a Juris Doctor in 2017 and with a Master of Laws in bioethics in 2019. They earned a Doctor of Juridical Science from the University of Toronto Faculty of Law in 2023, where they were also a Junior Fellow of Massey College.

== Career ==
In 2019, Ashley became a clerk at the Supreme Court of Canada, where they worked in the chambers of Justice Sheilah Martin. They have described themselves as "the first known openly transgender clerk" at the court. During the same year, the Canadian Bar Association awarded Ashley the SOGIC Hero Award.

Ashley coined the term gender modality in 2019.

In 2022, Ashley published Banning transgender conversion practices: a legal and policy analysis, a book about conversion therapy for transgender people. It studies how these therapies be legally banned, and what impact such bans would have on countries that decided to implement them. Ashley believes that conversion therapy needs to disappear and that a formal ban improves the situation without fully solving the issue. They cite the Centre for Addiction and Mental Health in Toronto as an example, saying that the practices there were so bad that they served as a precedent to get conversion therapy banned in the province of Ontario.

In 2023, they joined the University of Alberta Faculty of Law as an assistant professor.

On September 14, 2025, Ashley was placed on non-disciplinary administrative leave due to comments they made on social media about the assassination of Charlie Kirk. According to a statement from the University of Alberta, the suspension was taken while a review was conducted related to concerns about community safety. Ashley returned to work a week later on September 22, after the review concluded there was "no imminent risk associated with this incident." Ashley later criticized the suspension and argued their statements fell within the scope of academic freedom and freedom of expression.

== Selected academic publications ==
=== Books ===
- Ashley, Florence (1 April 2022). Banning transgender conversion practices: a legal and policy analysis. Law and Society. UBC Press. doi:10.59962/9780774866941. ISBN 978-0-7748-6692-7. OCLC 1276933161. OL 35589970M.
- Ashley, Florence (13 February 2024). Gender/Fucking: the Pleasures and Politics of Living in a Gendered Body. CLASH Books. ISBN 978-1-955904-93-3. OCLC 1376495878.

=== Articles ===
- Ashley, Florence; Brightly-Brown, Shari; Rider, G. Nic (13 June 2024). "Beyond the trans/cis binary: introducing new terms will enrich gender research". Nature. 630 (8016): 293–295. Bibcode:2024Natur.630..293A. doi:10.1038/d41586-024-01719-9. PMID 38858484.
- Ashley, Florence (1 July 2023). "What Is It like to Have a Gender Identity?". Mind. 132 (528): 1053–1073. doi:10.1093/mind/fzac071. ISSN 0026-4423.
- Ashley, Florence; Parsa, Neeki; kus, t; MacKinnon, K. R. (2023). "Do gender assessments prevent regret in transgender healthcare? A narrative review". Psychology of Sexual Orientation and Gender Diversity (Advance online publication). 11 (4): 553–562. doi:10.1037/sgd0000672.
- Ashley, Florence (7 February 2022). "Youth should decide: the principle of subsidiarity in paediatric transgender healthcare". Journal of Medical Ethics. 49 (2): 110–114. doi:10.1136/medethics-2021-107820. ISSN 0306-6800. PMID 35131805. S2CID 246636156.
- Salway, Travis; Ashley, Florence (10 January 2022). "Ridding Canadian medicine of conversion therapy". Canadian Medical Association Journal. 194 (1): E17–E18. doi:10.1503/cmaj.211709. ISSN 0820-3946. PMC 8800469. PMID 35012950.
- Ashley, Florence (20 December 2021). "The Constitutive In/visibility of the Trans Legal Subject: A Case Study". UCLA Women's Law Journal. 28 (1). doi:10.5070/L328155794. ISSN 1943-1708.
- Ashley, Florence (2021). "The Misuse of Gender Dysphoria: Toward Greater Conceptual Clarity in Transgender Health". Perspectives on Psychological Science. 16 (6): 1159–1164. doi:10.1177/1745691619872987. ISSN 1745-6916. PMID 31747342. S2CID 208214158.
- MacKinnon, K.R.; Ashley, Florence; Kia, H.; Lam, J.S.H.; Krakowsky, Y.; Ross, L.E. (2021). "Preventing transition "regret": An institutional ethnography of gender-affirming medical care assessment practices in Canada". Social Science & Medicine. 291 114477. doi:10.1016/j.socscimed.2021.114477. PMID 34666278.
- Ashley, Florence (2022). "The clinical irrelevance of "desistance" research for transgender and gender creative youth". Psychology of Sexual Orientation and Gender Diversity. 9 (4): 387–397. doi:10.1037/sgd0000504. ISSN 2329-0390. S2CID 239099559.

=== Essays ===
- 'Trans' is my gender modality: a modest terminological proposal, Trans Bodies, Trans Selves, 2nd ed., Laura Erickson-Schroth (ed.), Oxford University Press (2022)
