= The Bisexual Option =

1978 book by Fritz Klein

- Cover of the first edition
- Author: Fritz Klein
- Language: English
- Subject: Bisexuality
- Publisher: Harrington Park Press
- Publication date: 1978 (first edition), 1993 (second edition)
- Publication place: United States
- Media type: Print
- Pages: 215 (second edition)
- ISBN: 1-56023-033-9 (second edition)
- OCLC: 27187013

The Bisexual Option (1978; second edition 1993) is a book by the sex researcher Fritz Klein. It is considered one of the seminal works on bisexuality in the discipline of queer studies.

The Bisexual Option was developed based on Klein's belief that there was not enough publicly available information relating to bisexuality, and that providing information would allow bisexuals to feel more comfortable with their identities.

The book provides a general overview and explanation of bisexuality. It additionally addresses and disputes several myths related to bisexuality.

== Summary ==
The book discusses where people may fit on the sexual orientation continuum, specifically discussing bisexuality and the idea of feeling sexual attraction towards both men and women.

In addition to defining bisexuality, the book explains several problems bisexual people face in mainstream heterosexual and gay/lesbian communities. Klein specifically addresses the ideas that bisexuality does not exist, and that sexuality only allows for attraction to one gender, going on to establish these ideas as myths.

Klein additionally identifies seven variables which contribute to an individual's sexual identity. These variables are part of the Klein Sexual Orientation Grid, which Klein developed based on the Kinsey Scale. However, whereas the Kinsey Scale considers a person's sexuality based on a scale of 1-6, the Klein Sexual Orientation Grid uses seven different variables and treats sexuality as something that is fluid and can change with time. Klein uses the grid to establish his belief that sexuality is only partially defined by sexual behavior, something which was not clearly demonstrated via the Kinsey Scale.

The book includes information relating to historically significant bisexual figures. It also features a discussion of modern factors which influence bisexuality and bisexual people, including AIDs, feminism, and other factors.

== Reception and legacy ==
The Bisexual Option was seen as an important work relating to bisexuality, mainly for its comprehensive discussion of sexual identity and the factors which contribute to sexuality. Ulrich Gooß, discussing the book in the Journal of Bisexuality, described it as "a component of the process, begun in the 1970s, of establishing actual bisexuality as a sexual category".

== See also ==
- Bisexual community
- List of media portrayals of bisexuality
- Queer studies
