= Paula Rodriguez Rust =

American sociologist (born 1959)

Paula Claire Rodriguez Rust (born 1959) is an American sociologist who studies sexual orientation, especially bisexuality. Rust is editor of Bisexuality in the United States and author of Bisexuality and the Challenge to Lesbian Politics: Sex, Loyalty, and Revolution.

== Life and career ==
Rust earned a Ph.D. in sociology from University of Michigan in 1989. She has taught at Hamilton College and State University of New York at Geneseo. Rust is a member of the International Academy of Sex Research. She has been critical of 2005 work by J. Michael Bailey that did not detect a distinctly bisexual male genital arousal pattern (although in 2011 Bailey's lab did report finding it) and has advocated for more sophisticated models of sex, gender, and sexual orientation.

She and her partner Lorna Rodriguez Rust have four children. Rust serves on the New Jersey Special Task Force on Bullying, Cyberbullying Awareness and Prevention.

== Selected publications ==
- Rust PC (1992). The Politics of Sexual Identity: Sexual Attraction and Behavior among Lesbian and Bisexual Women, Social Problems, 1992, 39, 4, Nov, 366–386.
- Rust PC. The Salience of Problematic Sexual Identity among Lesbians, Bisexual Women, and Lesbian Sadomasochists
- Rust PC (1993). Neutralizing the political threat of the marginal woman: Lesbians' beliefs about bisexual women. Journal of Sex Research, 30, 214–228.
- Rust PC (1993). Gay Culture in America: Essays from the Field, Contemporary Sociology, 1993, 22, 2, Mar, 232–233.
- Rust PC. How Bisexuality Challenges Categories of Sexuality and Gender
- Rust PC (1994). Designing a Course on Sexuality: Issues, Problems, and Parameters, Critical Sociology, 1994, 20, 3, 155–168.
- Rust PC (1994). Dual Attraction: Understanding Bisexuality, American Journal of Sociology, 1994, 100, 3, Nov, 851–853.
- Rust PC. From Biphobia to Bipride: Changes in Self-Identified Bisexual Women's Attitudes toward Themselves during a Decade of Growing Bisexual Political Activism
- Rust PC (1995). Bisexuality and the Challenge to Lesbian Politics: Sex, Loyalty and Revolution. New York University Press, ISBN 978-0-8147-7445-8
- Rust PC (1996). Managing multiple identities: Diversity among bisexual women and men. In Bisexuality: The psychology and politics of an invisible minority. Edited by Firestein, Beth A., 1996. Thousand Oaks, CA, US: Sage Publications, Inc. pp. 53–83.
- Rust PC (1996). "Sexual Identity and Bisexual Identities: The Struggle for Self-Description in a Changing Sexual Landscape" In Queer Studies: A Lesbian, Gay, Bisexual and Transgendered Anthology. Edited by Brett Beemyn and Mickey Eliason, 1996.
- Rust PC (1996). Monogamy and polyamory: Relationship issues for bisexuals. In Bisexuality: The psychology and politics of an invisible minority. Edited by Firestein, Beth A., 1996. Thousand Oaks, CA, US: Sage Publications, Inc. pp. 127–148.
- Rust PC (1997). Identity Politics: Lesbian Feminism and the Limits of Community, Archives of Sexual Behavior, 1997, 26, 5, Oct, 564–567.
- Rust PC (1998). Transgendered Bisexuals: An Identity Quadri-Lemma. Society for the Study of Social Problems (SSSP)
- Rust PC (1999). Lesbians in Academia: Degrees of Freedom. Gender & Society, 1999, 13, 3, June, 419–420.
- Rust PC (2000). Bisexuality: A contemporary paradox for women, Journal of Social Issues, Vol 56(2), Sum 2000. Special Issue: Women's sexualities: New perspectives on sexual orientation and gender. pp. 205–221.
- Rust PC (Ed.) (2001a). Bisexuality in the United States: A social science reader. Columbia University Press, ISBN 978-0-231-10227-8
- Rust PC (2001b) Make Me a Map: Bisexual Men's Images of Bisexual Community. Journal of Bisexuality, 1, 47–108.
- Rust PC (2001c). Too many and not enough: The meanings of bisexual identities. Journal of Bisexuality, 1, 33–68.
