= M. Paz Galupo =

American psychologist

- Education: Miami University; University of Arkansas
- Occupation: Psychologist

M. Paz Galupo is an American psychologist. They (Note: Galupo uses the pronouns she/her and they/them. This article uses they/them for consistency.) are the Audre Lorde Distinguished Professor at Washington University in St. Louis. They previously served as a professor in the department of psychology at Towson University.

As of 2026, Galupo has served as editor-in-chief of Psychology of Sexual Orientation and Gender Diversity and the Journal of Bisexuality.
