= Klein Sexual Orientation Grid =

Multidimensional scale of human sexuality

The Klein Sexual Orientation Grid (KSOG) developed by Fritz Klein attempts to measure sexual orientation by expanding upon the earlier Kinsey scale. Fritz Klein founded the American Institute of Bisexuality in 1998 which is continuing his work by sponsoring bisexual-inclusive sex research, educating the general public on sexuality, and promoting the bisexual community.

Klein first described the KSOG in his 1978 book The Bisexual Option. In response to the criticism of the Kinsey scale only measuring two dimensions of sexual orientation, Klein developed a multidimensional grid for describing sexual orientation. Unlike the Kinsey scale, the Klein grid investigates sexual orientation in the past, the present and in the idealized future with respect to seven factors each, for a total of twenty-one values. The KSOG uses values of 1–7, rather than the 0–6 scale of the Kinsey scale, to describe a continuum from exclusively opposite-sex to exclusively same-sex attraction.

== Overview ==
The KSOG is often used as a tool in research. Introduced in Klein's book The Bisexual Option the KSOG uses a seven-point scale to assess seven different dimensions of sexuality at three different points in an individual's life: past (from early adolescence up to one year ago), present (within the last 12 months), and ideal (what would be chosen if it were voluntary).

Studies using the KSOG have used cluster analysis to investigate patterns within the KSOG's twenty-one parameters, in one case suggesting a five-label (straight, bi-straight, bi-bi, bi-gay, gay) model of orientation.

The KSOG has also been used in studies of conversion therapy. See Exodus International#Jones and Yarhouse

Klein sexual orientation grid
Variable		Determinant	Past	Present	Ideal
A	Sexual attraction	To whom are you sexually attracted?	1–7	1–7	1–7
B	Sexual behaviour	With whom have you had sex?	1–7	1–7	1–7
C	Sexual fantasies	About whom are your sexual fantasies?	1–7	1–7	1–7
D	Emotional preference	Who do you feel more drawn to or close to emotionally?	1–7	1–7	1–7
E	Social preference	Which gender do you socialize with?	1–7	1–7	1–7
F	Lifestyle preference	In which community do you like to spend your time? In which do you feel most comfortable?	1–7	1–7	1–7
G	Self-identification	How do you label or identify yourself?	1–7	1–7	1–7

Scale to measure variables A , B , C , D , and E of the KSOG
1	2	3	4	5	6	7
other sex only	other sex mostly	other sex somewhat more	both sexes equally	same sex somewhat more	same sex mostly	same sex only

Scale to measure variables F and G of the KSOG
1	2	3	4	5	6	7
heterosexual only	heterosexual mostly	heterosexual somewhat more	heterosexual and homosexual equally	homosexual somewhat more	homosexual mostly	homosexual only

== Shortcomings ==
Klein, while recognizing that the grid explores many more dimensions of sexual orientation than previous scales, acknowledged that it omits the following "aspects" of sexual orientation:

- Age of partner
- Differentiation of love and friendship in the emotional preference variable
- Sexual attraction being distinguished between sexual desire and limerence
- Whether sexual activity referred to number of partners or number of occurrences
- Sex roles as well as masculine and feminine roles

Additionally, factors not addressed by Klein include:

- Attraction to non-binary/transgender orientations.

While Klein held the belief that including more dimensions of sexual orientation was better, Weinrich et al. (1993) found that all of the dimensions of the KSOG seemed to be measuring the same construct. The study conducted a factor analysis of the KSOG to see how many factors emerged in two different samples. In both groups, the first factor to emerge loaded substantially on all of the grid's 21 items, indicating that this factor accounted for a majority of the variance. They further found that a second factor emerged containing time dimensions of social and emotional preferences, suggesting that those dimensions may have also been measuring something other than sexual orientation. Therefore, despite the scale being helpful in promoting the concept of sexual orientation as being multidimensional and dynamic, the additional dimensions measured do not necessarily reveal any more of an accurate description of one's overall sexual orientation than the Kinsey scale.

Another concern with the KSOG is that different dimensions of sexual orientation may not identify all people of a certain orientation in the same way. Measures of sexual attraction, sexual activity, and sexual identity identify different (though often overlapping) populations. Laumann et al. (1994) found that of the 8.6% of women reporting some same gender sexuality, 88% reported same gender sexual attraction, 41% reported some same gender sexual behaviour and 16% reported a lesbian or gay identity.

== See also ==
- Affectional orientation
