= Journal of Bisexuality =

- Discipline: Sexology, queer studies
- Language: English
- Edited by: M. Paz Galupo

Publication details
- History: 2000–present
- Publisher: Routledge
- Frequency: Quarterly
- Open access: Hybrid
- Impact factor: 1.9 (2024)

Standard abbreviations
- ISO 4: J. Bisex.

Indexing
- ISSN: 1529-9716 (print); 1529-9724 (web)
- LCCN: 00215112
- OCLC no.: 43972964

Links
- Journal homepage; Online access; Online archive

The Journal of Bisexuality is a quarterly peer-reviewed academic journal published quarterly by Routledge. It is the official journal of the American Institute of Bisexuality. It covers a wide range of topics on bisexuality including new bisexuality research, bisexual issues in therapy, differences from the straight, lesbian and gay communities, growth of the bisexual movement, bisexuality and the media, bisexual history, and different bisexual lifestyles.

In addition, the journal also publishes book and movie reviews covering bisexual lead characters from every era. Special thematic issues cover topics singularly; such as women and bisexuality — a global perspective, bisexual women in the 21st century, bisexual men in culture and society, and bisexuality in the lives of men.

The journal was established in 2000. Its first editor-in-chief was Fritz Klein, followed by Jonathan Alexander, Brian Zamboni, and James D. Weinrich. In 2014, M. Paz Galupo (Towson University) became its first female editor-in-chief.

== Abstracting and indexing ==
The journal is abstracted and indexed in:

- EBSCO databases
- Emerging Sources Citation Index
- International Bibliography of Periodical Literature
- Modern Language Association Database
- ProQuest databases
- PsycINFO
- Scopus

== Impact ==
According to the Journal Citation Reports, the Journal of Bisexuality had a 2024 journal impact factor of 1.9, ranking it 65th out of 271 interdisciplinary social sciences journals.

== See also ==
- Journal of Homosexuality
- Journal of Lesbian Studies
- List of sexology journals
