= Fritz Klein (sex researcher) =

Austrian-born American psychiatrist (1932–2006)

- Born: Fred Klein; December 27, 1932; Vienna, Austria
- Died: May 24, 2006 (aged 73); San Diego, California, U.S.
- Education: Yeshiva University (BA); Columbia University (MBA); University of Bern (MD)
- Occupation: Psychiatrist
- Partner: Tom Reise
- Scientific career
- Fields: Sexology; psychiatry

Fred "Fritz" Klein (December 27, 1932 – May 24, 2006) was an Austrian-born American psychiatrist and sex researcher who studied bisexuals and their relationships. He was an author and editor, as well as the developer of the Klein Sexual Orientation Grid, a scale that measures an individual's sexual orientation. Klein believed that sexual orientation could change over the course of a lifetime and that researchers underestimated the number of men that had sexual interactions with both sexes. Klein founded the American Institute of Bisexuality in 1998, which is continuing his work by sponsoring bisexual-inclusive sex research, educating the general public on sexuality, and promoting bisexual culture and community.

== Life and career ==
Klein was born in Vienna, Austria, to Orthodox Jewish parents. He and his family fled to New York City when he was a child, to escape antisemitism.

He received a BA from Yeshiva University in 1953, and an MBA from Columbia University in 1955. He studied medicine at University of Bern in Switzerland for six years, receiving his MD in 1971.

Self-identifying as bisexual, Klein was surprised at the lack of literature on his sexuality in the New York Public Library in 1974. That year he founded the Bisexual Forum, the world's first bisexual group.

== Klein Sexual Orientation Grid and other works ==
He devised the Klein Sexual Orientation Grid, a multi-dimensional system for describing complex sexual orientation, similar to the "zero-to-six" scale Kinsey scale used by Alfred Kinsey, but measuring seven different vectors of sexual orientation and identity (sexual attractions, sexual behavior, sexual fantasies, emotional preference, social preference, lifestyle and self-identification) separately, as they relate person's past, present and ideal future.

Klein published The Bisexual Option: A Concept of One Hundred Percent Intimacy in 1978, based on his research. He also co-authored The Male, His Body, His Sex in 1978. Klein moved to San Diego in 1982. He published Bisexualities: Theory and Research in 1986. In 1996, he created a website (bisexual.org, now known as bi.org) to raise awareness and information about and for bisexuals. In 1998 he founded the American Institute of Bisexuality (AIB), also known as the Bisexual Foundation or the Bi Foundation, to encourage, support and assist research and education about bisexuality. Klein also founded the Journal of Bisexuality. He remained the Journal's principal editor until his death. He published Bisexual and Gay Husbands: Their Stories, Their Words in 2001. Klein published a novel, Life, Sex and the Pursuit of Happiness in 2005.

In 2006 Klein was diagnosed with cancer, and underwent surgery as a result. On May 24 of that year, he died from a heart attack at his home in San Diego, aged 73. He was survived by two brothers and his life partner, Tom Reise. Klein donated his body to science.
