= American Institute of Bisexuality =

Nonprofit organization

American Institute of Bisexuality (AIB)
- American Institute of Bisexuality logo
- Formation: 1998
- Website: www.bisexuality.org

The American Institute of Bisexuality (AIB) is a charity founded on July 23, 1998, by sex researcher, psychiatrist and bisexual rights activist Fritz Klein to promote research and education about bisexuality.

AIB produces the Journal of Bisexuality, a quarterly academic journal focusing on issues relating to bisexuality. In addition, it runs bi.org, a bisexuality visibility, education and outreach website for the general public, and the magazine Queer Majority.

AIB maintains a division known as the Bi Foundation that conducts outreach, community building, and education across the globe. The Institute is a Delaware non-profit corporation qualified for tax purposes as a private foundation under Section 501(c)(3) of the U.S. Internal Revenue Code.

AIB offers grants toward research and programming related to bisexuality.

== BiReConUSA ==
In June 2013, the American Institute of Bisexuality and the Bisexual Organizing Project funded the first BiReConUSA, modeled on BiReCon (UK). It was co-chaired by Dr. Lauren Beach and Alex Iantaffi.

== See also ==
- Bisexual community
- Klein Sexual Orientation Grid
