= Bi Community News =

British magazine serving the bisexual population

- BCN cover (Issue 102, August 2010)
- Editor: Jen Yockney
- Categories: Bisexual
- Frequency: Bimonthly
- First issue: October 1995
- Country: United Kingdom
- Based in: Manchester
- Language: English
- Website: Official website
- ISSN: 1757-6938

Bi Community News (commonly shortened to BCN) is a bimonthly magazine, and the United Kingdom's only magazine serving the bisexual population. It is published bimonthly and includes many articles reflecting bisexual life and media representation as well as news from the bisexual community.

Resulting from a workshop at the UK BiCon in 1995, it started as a zine moving to being a full-colour glossy magazine around 2010. It has been consistently published since October 1995. The current editor is Jen Yockney MBE.

Previous UK bisexual journals were BiFrost (1991–1995) and Bi Monthly in the 1980s.

== Content ==
Each issue of Bi Community News has a mixture of regular columns and topical or one-off articles, interviews and features. A "serialised short story", Fixation, ran for two years.

=== Noticeboard ===
The noticeboard page covers small items of news with bi relevance such as consultations on legal changes or announcements of dates for events.

=== BiMediaWatch ===
This appears every issue and reports on bi representation on television and in film, in newspaper articles and on radio. It is mostly focused on UK media but includes items from the rest of the world in some editions.

=== Different For Bis ===
This is a regular column since 2015, highlighting new research on bisexuality, and exploring the bi data within general and LGBT research. The title was the draft working name for the 2012 Bisexuality Report, which brought together research on bisexuality in the UK.

=== Community Listings ===
Each edition lists national and local bi or bi-relevant organisations in the UK and Ireland. There is also a section on popular resources on research and advice, and upcoming bisexual community events dates.

=== "Cover Bis" ===
When Bi Community News switched from a newsletter/zine format to mainstream magazine in style it changed from text covers to photo covers. Featured "cover bis" include both members of the UK bisexual community and people in the public eye who are either out as bisexual or have played bi characters in TV and film.

== Side publications ==
In 2001 BCN published "An A-Z of Bi Group Running", a resource for helping build local community support. It was written by Jen Yockney based on five years of organising Manchester-based bisexual community group BiPhoria and BiCon workshops about bi group organising.

A fundraising erotic stories compilation, "Salacious Stories for Boys and Girls" in 2005, was followed in 2006 by a one-off fundraising calendar with photos of activists from around the UK working on different parts of advancing bi representation and support.

In 2007 BCN published "Both Directions", a 20-page guide to the UK bisexual scene and its history, as well as bi books, films and other resources. Further editions were published each year until 2011 when BiPhoria published "Getting Bi In A Gay / Straight World". BCN's website recommended that over their own Both Directions title as more accessible.

== Awards ==
BCN was shortlisted for Community Group or Organisation of the Year in the 2011 Homo Hero Awards, alongside Outdoor Lads and the Albert Kennedy Trust.

== Community engagement ==
Because of its community newsletter roots the magazine has strong links with the grassroots bisexual community. It acts as postal box address for local bi groups without their own secure mail facilities, maintains the Bi Local Groups Network, and hosted several UK Bi Activist Weekends bringing together volunteers running bisexual community organisations around the UK.

The magazine's web server also hosts the international website for Bi Visibility Day.
