= Psychology of Sexual Orientation and Gender Diversity =

- Discipline: Social Psychology
- Language: English
- Edited by: M. Paz Galupo

Publication details
- History: 2014-present
- Publisher: American Psychological Association (United States)
- Frequency: Quarterly

Standard abbreviations
- ISO 4: Psychol. Sex. Orientat. Gend. Divers.

Indexing
- ISSN: 2329-0382 (print); 2329-0390 (web)

Links
- Journal homepage; Online access

Psychology of Sexual Orientation and Gender Diversity is a quarterly peer-reviewed academic journal published by the American Psychological Association. The journal is the official publication of APA Division 44 (Society for the Psychological Study of Lesbian, Gay, Bisexual, and Transgender Issues). A scholarly journal dedicated to the dissemination of information in the field of sexual orientation and gender diversity, the journal is a primary outlet for research particularly as it impacts practice, education, public policy, and social action.

== Abstracting and indexing ==
The journal is abstracted and indexed by PsycINFO.

== See also ==
- List of psychology journals
- LGBT
- List of LGBT periodicals

== Editors ==
The current editor-in-chief is M. Paz Galupo (Towson University).
