= Sexual orientation =

Pattern of romantic/sexual attraction based on sex/gender

Sexual orientation is an enduring personal pattern of romantic attraction or sexual attraction (or a combination of these) to persons of the opposite sex or gender, the same sex or gender, or to both sexes or more than one gender. Patterns are generally categorized under heterosexuality, homosexuality, and bisexuality, while asexuality (experiencing no sexual attraction to others) is sometimes identified as the fourth category.

These categories are aspects of the more nuanced nature of sexual identity and terminology. For example, people may use other labels, such as pansexual or polysexual, or none at all. According to the American Psychological Association, sexual orientation "also refers to a person's sense of identity based on those attractions, related behaviors, and membership in a community of others who share those attractions". Androphilia and gynephilia are terms used in behavioral science to describe sexual orientation as an alternative to a gender binary conceptualization. Androphilia describes sexual attraction to masculinity; gynephilia describes the sexual attraction to femininity. The term sexual preference largely overlaps with sexual orientation, but is generally distinguished in psychological research. A person who identifies as bisexual, for example, may sexually prefer one sex over the other. Sexual preference may also suggest a degree of voluntary choice, whereas sexual orientation is not a choice.

Although no single theory on the cause of sexual orientation has yet gained widespread support, scientists favor biological theories. There is considerably more evidence supporting nonsocial, biological causes of sexual orientation than social ones, especially for males. A major hypothesis implicates the prenatal environment, specifically the organizational effects of hormones on the fetal brain. There is no substantive evidence which suggests parenting or early childhood experiences play a role in developing a sexual orientation. Across cultures, most people are heterosexual, with a minority of people having a homosexual or bisexual orientation. A person's sexual orientation can be anywhere on a continuum, from exclusive attraction to the opposite sex to exclusive attraction to the same sex.

Sexual orientation is studied primarily within biology, anthropology, and psychology (including sexology), but it is also a subject area in sociology, history (including social constructionist perspectives), and law.

== Definitions and distinguishing from sexual identity and behavior ==
=== General ===
Sexual orientation is traditionally defined as including heterosexuality, bisexuality, and homosexuality, while asexuality is considered the fourth category of sexual orientation by some researchers and has been defined as the absence of a traditional sexual orientation. An asexual person has little to no sexual attraction to people. It may be considered a lack of a sexual orientation, and there is significant debate over whether or not it is a sexual orientation.

Most definitions of sexual orientation include a psychological component, such as the direction of an individual's erotic desires, or a behavioral component, which focuses on the sex of the individual's sexual partners. Some people prefer simply to follow an individual's self-definition or identity. Scientific and professional understanding is that "the core attractions that form the basis for adult sexual orientation typically emerge between middle childhood and early adolescence". Sexual orientation differs from sexual identity in that it encompasses relationships with others, while sexual identity is a concept of self.

The American Psychological Association states that "[s]exual orientation refers to an enduring pattern of emotional, romantic, and/or sexual attractions to men, women, or both sexes" and that "[t]his range of behaviors and attractions has been described in various cultures and nations throughout the world. Many cultures use identity labels to describe people who express these attractions. In the United States, the most frequent labels are lesbians (women attracted to other women), gay men (men attracted to other men), and bisexuals (people attracted to both sexes). However, some people may use different labels or none at all". They additionally state that sexual orientation "is distinct from other components of sex and gender, including biological sex (the anatomical, physiological, and genetic characteristics associated with being male or female), gender identity (the psychological sense of being male or female), and social gender role (the cultural norms that define feminine and masculine behavior)".

Sexual identity and sexual behavior are closely related to sexual orientation, but they are distinguished, with sexual identity referring to an individual's conception of themselves, behavior referring to actual sexual acts performed by the individual, and orientation referring to "fantasies, attachments and longings." Individuals may or may not express their sexual orientation in their behaviors. People who have a non-heterosexual sexual orientation that does not align with their sexual identity are sometimes referred to as 'closeted'. The term may, however, reflect a certain cultural context and particular stage of transition in societies which are gradually dealing with integrating sexual minorities. In studies related to sexual orientation, when dealing with the degree to which a person's sexual attractions, behaviors and identity match, scientists usually use the terms concordance or discordance. Thus, a woman who is attracted to other women, but calls herself heterosexual and only has sexual relations with men, can be said to experience discordance between her sexual orientation (homosexual or lesbian) and her sexual identity and behaviors (heterosexual).

Sexual identity may also be used to describe a person's perception of their own sex, rather than sexual orientation. The term sexual preference has a similar meaning to sexual orientation, and the two terms are often used interchangeably, but the American Psychological Association states sexual preference suggests a degree of voluntary choice. The term has been listed by the American Psychological Association's Committee on Gay and Lesbian Concerns as a wording that advances a "heterosexual bias". The term sexual orientation was introduced by sexologist John Money in place of sexual preference, arguing that attraction is not necessarily a matter of free choice.

=== Androphilia, gynephilia, and other terms ===
Androphilia and gynephilia (or gynecophilia) are terms used in behavioral science to describe sexual attraction, as an alternative to a homosexual and heterosexual conceptualization. They are used for identifying a subject's object of attraction without attributing a sex assignment or gender identity to the subject. Related terms such as pansexual and polysexual do not make any such assignations to the subject. People may also use terms such as queer, pansensual, polyfidelitous, ambisexual, or personalized identities such as byke or biphilic.

Using androphilia and gynephilia can avoid confusion and offense when describing people in non-western cultures, as well as when describing intersex and transgender people. Psychiatrist Anil Aggrawal explains that androphilia, along with gynephilia,

is needed to overcome immense difficulties in characterizing the sexual orientation of trans men and trans women. For instance, it is difficult to decide whether a trans man erotically attracted to males is a heterosexual female or a homosexual male; or a trans woman erotically attracted to females is a heterosexual male or a lesbian female. Any attempt to classify them may not only cause confusion but arouse offense among the affected subjects. In such cases, while defining sexual attraction, it is best to focus on the object of their attraction rather than on the sex or gender of the subject.

Sexologist Milton Diamond writes, "The terms heterosexual, homosexual, and bisexual are better used as adjectives, not nouns, and are better applied to behaviors, not people. This usage is particularly advantageous when discussing the partners of transsexual or intersexed individuals. These newer terms also do not carry the social weight of the former ones."

Some researchers advocate use of the terminology to avoid bias inherent in Western conceptualizations of human sexuality. Writing about the Samoan fa'afafine demographic, sociologist Johanna Schmidt writes that in cultures where a third gender is recognized, a term like "homosexual transsexual" does not align with cultural categories.

Some researchers, such as Bruce Bagemihl, have criticized certain ways the labels "heterosexual" and "homosexual" have been used for transgender people, writing, "...the point of reference for 'heterosexual' or 'homosexual' orientation in this nomenclature is solely the individual's genetic sex prior to reassignment (see for example, Blanchard et al. 1987, Coleman and Bockting, 1988, Blanchard, 1989). These labels thereby ignore the individual's personal sense of gender identity taking precedence over biological sex, rather than the other way around." Bagemihl goes on to take issue with the way this terminology makes it easy to claim transsexuals are really homosexual males seeking to escape from stigma.

Terms have been proposed for sexual attraction to a person assigned male at birth with a feminine gender expression, including gynandromorphophilia (adjective: gynandromorphophilic) and gynemimetophilia (adj.: gynemimetophilic).

=== Gender, transgender, cisgender, and conformance ===
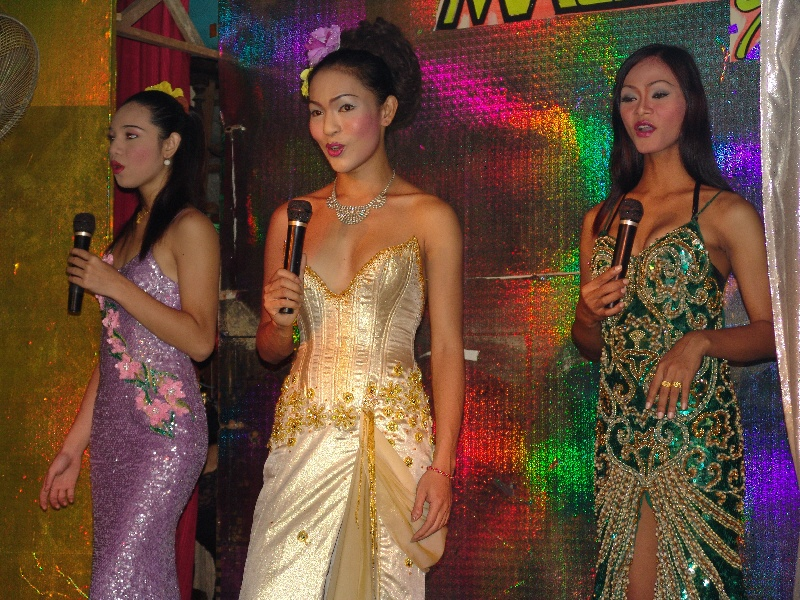
Katheoys in Thailand

The earliest writers on sexual orientation usually understood it to be intrinsically linked to the subject's own sex. For example, it was thought that a typical female-bodied person who is attracted to female-bodied persons would have masculine attributes, and vice versa. This understanding was shared by most of the significant theorists of sexual orientation from the mid nineteenth to early twentieth century, such as Karl Heinrich Ulrichs, Richard von Krafft-Ebing, Magnus Hirschfeld, Havelock Ellis, Carl Jung, and Sigmund Freud, as well as many gender-variant homosexual people themselves. However, this understanding of homosexuality as sexual inversion was disputed at the time, and, through the second half of the twentieth century, gender identity came to be increasingly seen as a phenomenon distinct from sexual orientation. Transgender and cisgender people may be attracted to men, women, or both, although the prevalence of different sexual orientations is quite different in these two populations. An individual homosexual, heterosexual, or bisexual person may be masculine, feminine, or androgynous. Nevertheless, an analysis by J. Michael Bailey and Kenneth Zucker found a majority of the gay men and lesbians sampled in multiple studies reported "substantially more" cross-sex-typed behavior in childhood than heterosexual subjects.

Sexual orientation sees greater intricacy when non-binary understandings of both sex and gender are considered. Sociologist Paula Rodriguez Rust (2000) argues for a more multifaceted definition of sexual orientation:

Most alternative models of sexuality... define sexual orientation in terms of dichotomous biological sex or gender... Most theorists would not eliminate the reference to sex or gender, but instead advocate incorporating more complex nonbinary concepts of sex or gender, more complex relationships between sex, gender, and sexuality, and/or additional nongendered dimensions into models of sexuality.

=== Relationships outside of orientation ===
Gay and lesbian people can have sexual relationships with someone of the opposite sex for a variety of reasons, including the desire for a perceived traditional family and concerns of discrimination and religious ostracism. While some LGBTQ people hide their respective orientations from their spouses, others develop positive gay and lesbian identities while maintaining successful heterosexual marriages. Coming out of the closet to oneself, a spouse of the opposite sex, and children can present challenges that are not faced by gay and lesbian people who are not married to people of the opposite sex or do not have children.

=== Fluidity ===
Often, sexual orientation and sexual orientation identity are not distinguished, which can impact accurately assessing sexual identity and whether or not sexual orientation is able to change; sexual orientation identity can change throughout an individual's life, and may or may not align with biological sex, sexual behavior, or actual sexual orientation. Sexual orientation is stable and unchanging for the vast majority of people, but some research indicates that some people may experience change in their sexual orientation, and this is more likely for women than for men. The American Psychological Association distinguishes between sexual orientation (an innate attraction) and sexual orientation identity (which may change at any point in a person's life).

== Causes ==
The exact causes for the development of a particular sexual orientation have yet to be established. To date, much research has been conducted to determine the influence of genetics, hormonal action, development dynamics, social and cultural influences—which has led many to think that biology and environment factors play a complex role in forming it.

=== Biology ===
Research has identified several biological factors which may be related to the development of sexual orientation, including genes, prenatal hormones, and brain structure. No single controlling cause has been identified, and research is continuing in this area.

Although researchers generally believe that sexual orientation is not determined by any one factor but by a combination of genetic, hormonal, and environmental influences, with biological factors involving a complex interplay of genetic factors and the early uterine environment, they favor biological models for the cause. There is considerably more evidence supporting nonsocial, biological causes of sexual orientation than social ones, especially for males. Scientists do not believe that sexual orientation is a choice, and some of them believe that it is established at conception. Current scientific investigation usually seeks to find biological explanations for the adoption of a particular sexual orientation. Scientific studies have found a number of statistical biological differences between gay people and heterosexuals, which may result from the same underlying cause as sexual orientation itself.

==== Genetic factors ====
Genes may be related to the development of sexual orientation. A twin study from 2001 appears to exclude genes as a major factor, while a twin study from 2010 found that homosexuality was explained by both genes and environmental factors. However, experimental design of the available twin studies has made their interpretation difficult.

In 2012, a large, comprehensive genome-wide linkage study of male sexual orientation was conducted by several independent groups of researchers. Significant linkage to homosexuality was found with genes on chromosome Xq28 and chromosome 8 in the pericentromeric region. The authors concluded that "our findings, taken in context with previous work, suggest that genetic variation in each of these regions contributes to development of the important psychological trait of male sexual orientation." It was the largest study of the genetic basis of homosexuality to date and was published online in November 2014.

However, in August 2019, a genome-wide association study of 493,001 individuals concluded that hundreds or thousands of genetic variants underlie homosexual behavior in both sexes, with 5 variants in particular being significantly associated. They stated that in contrast to linkage studies that found substantial association of sexual orientation with variants on the X-chromosome, they found no excess of signal (and no individual genome-wide significant variants) on Xq28 or the rest of the X chromosome.

==== Hormones ====
The hormonal theory of sexuality holds that just as exposure to certain hormones plays a role in fetal sex differentiation, hormonal exposure also influences the sexual orientation that emerges later in the adult. Fetal hormones may be seen as either the primary influence upon adult sexual orientation or as a co-factor interacting with genes or environmental and social conditions.

For humans, the norm is that females possess two X sex chromosomes, while males have one X and one Y. The default developmental pathway for a human fetus being female, the Y chromosome is what induces the changes necessary to shift to the male developmental pathway. This differentiation process is driven by androgen hormones, mainly testosterone and dihydrotestosterone (DHT). The newly formed testicles in the fetus are responsible for the secretion of androgens, which will cooperate in driving the sexual differentiation of the developing fetus, including its brain. This results in sexual differences between males and females. This fact has led some scientists to test in various ways the result of modifying androgen exposure levels in mammals during fetus and early life.

==== Birth order ====
A significant volume of research has demonstrated that the probability of a male growing up to be gay increases with each older brother he has from the same mother. Known as the fraternal birth order (FBO) effect, scientists attribute this to a prenatal biological mechanism – specifically a maternal immune response to male fetuses – since the effect is only present in men with older biological brothers, and not present among men with older step-brothers and adoptive brothers. This process, known as the maternal immunization hypothesis (MIH), would begin when cells from a male fetus enter the mother's circulation during pregnancy. These cells carry Y-proteins, which are thought to play a role in brain masculinisation (sex-differentiation) during fetal development. The mother's immune system builds antibodies to these Y-proteins. These antibodies are later released on future male fetuses and interfere with the masculinization role of Y-proteins, leaving regions of the brain responsible for sexual orientation in the 'default' female-typical arrangement, causing the exposed son to be more attracted to men over women. Biochemical evidence for this hypothesis was identified in 2017, finding that mothers with a gay son, especially those with older brothers, had significantly higher levels of anti-bodies to the NLGN4Y Y-protein than mothers with heterosexual sons.

The effect becomes stronger with each successive male pregnancy, meaning the odds of the next son being gay increase by 38–48%. This does not mean that all or most sons will be gay after several male pregnancies, but rather, the odds of having a gay son increase from approximately 2% for the first born son, to 4% for the second, 6% for the third and so on. Scientists have estimated between 15% and 29% of gay men may owe their sexual orientation to this effect, but the number may be higher, as prior miscarriages and terminations of male pregnancies may have exposed their mothers to Y-linked antigens. The fraternal birth order effect would not likely apply to first born gay sons; instead, scientists say they may owe their orientation to genes, prenatal hormones and other maternal immune responses which also influence brain development. This effect is nullified if the man is left-handed. Ray Blanchard and Anthony Bogaert are credited with discovering the effect in the 1990s. J. Michael Bailey and Jacques Balthazart say the FBO effect demonstrates that sexual orientation is heavily influenced by prenatal biological mechanisms rather than unidentified factors in socialization.

=== Social hypotheses ===
In the field of genetics, any factor which is non-genetic is considered an environmental influence. However, environmental influence does not automatically imply that the social environment influences or contributes to the development of sexual orientation. There is a vast non-social environment that is non-genetic yet still biological, such as prenatal development, that likely helps shape sexual orientation.

There is no substantive evidence to support the suggestion that early childhood experiences, parenting, sexual abuse, or other adverse life events influence sexual orientation. Hypotheses for the impact of the post-natal social environment on sexual orientation are weak, especially for males. Parental attitudes may affect whether or not children openly identify with their sexual orientation. Though it has since been found to be based on prejudice and misinformation, it was once thought that homosexuality was the result of faulty psychological development, resulting from childhood experiences and troubled relationships, including childhood sexual abuse. Such hypotheses "have been associated with highly charged political, moral and theological grounds for wanting to believe that it can".

=== Influences: professional organizations' statements ===
The American Academy of Pediatrics in 2004 stated:

The mechanisms for the development of a particular sexual orientation remain unclear, but the current literature and most scholars in the field state that one's sexual orientation is not a choice; that is, individuals do not choose to be homosexual or heterosexual. A variety of theories about the influences on sexual orientation have been proposed. Sexual orientation probably is not determined by any one factor but by a combination of genetic, hormonal, and environmental influences. In recent decades, biologically based theories have been favored by experts. Although there continues to be controversy and uncertainty as to the genesis of the variety of human sexual orientations, there is no scientific evidence that abnormal parenting, sexual abuse, or other adverse life events influence sexual orientation. Current knowledge suggests that sexual orientation is usually established during early childhood.

The American Psychological Association, the American Psychiatric Association, and the National Association of Social Workers in 2006 stated:

Currently, there is no scientific consensus about the specific factors that cause an individual to become heterosexual, homosexual, or bisexual – including possible biological, psychological, or social effects of the parents' sexual orientation. However, the available evidence indicates that the vast majority of lesbian and gay adults were raised by heterosexual parents and the vast majority of children raised by lesbian and gay parents eventually grow up to be heterosexual.

The Royal College of Psychiatrists in 2007 stated:

Despite almost a century of psychoanalytic and psychological speculation, there is no substantive evidence to support the suggestion that the nature of parenting or early childhood experiences play any role in the formation of a person's fundamental heterosexual or homosexual orientation. It would appear that sexual orientation is biological in nature, determined by a complex interplay of genetic factors and the early uterine environment. Sexual orientation is therefore not a choice, though sexual behaviour clearly is.

The American Psychiatric Association stated in 2011:

No one knows what causes heterosexuality, homosexuality, or bisexuality. Homosexuality was once thought to be the result of troubled family dynamics or faulty psychological development. Those assumptions are now understood to have been based on misinformation and prejudice.

A legal brief dated September 26, 2007, and presented on behalf of the American Psychological Association, California Psychological Association, American Psychiatric Association, National Association of Social Workers, and National Association of Social Workers, California Chapter, stated:

Although much research has examined the possible genetic, hormonal, developmental, social, and cultural influences on sexual orientation, no findings have emerged that permit scientists to conclude that sexual orientation – heterosexuality, homosexuality, or bisexuality – is determined by any particular factor or factors. The evaluation of amici is that, although some of this research may be promising in facilitating greater understanding of the development of sexual orientation, it does not permit a conclusion based in sound science at the present time as to the cause or causes of sexual orientation, whether homosexual, bisexual, or heterosexual.

== Efforts to change sexual orientation ==
Sexual orientation change efforts are methods that aim to change a same-sex sexual orientation. They may include behavioral techniques, cognitive behavioral therapy, reparative therapy, psychoanalytic techniques, medical approaches, and religious and spiritual approaches.

No major mental health professional organization sanctions efforts to change sexual orientation and virtually all of them have adopted policy statements cautioning the profession and the public about treatments that purport to change sexual orientation. These include the American Psychiatric Association, American Psychological Association, American Counseling Association, National Association of Social Workers in the US, the Royal College of Psychiatrists, and the Australian Psychological Society.

In 2009, the American Psychological Association Task Force on Appropriate Therapeutic Responses to Sexual Orientation conducted a systematic review of the peer-reviewed journal literature on sexual orientation change efforts (SOCE) and concluded:

Efforts to change sexual orientation are unlikely to be successful and involve some risk of harm, contrary to the claims of SOCE practitioners and advocates. Even though the research and clinical literature demonstrate that same-sex sexual and romantic attractions, feelings, and behaviors are normal and positive variations of human sexuality, regardless of sexual orientation identity, the task force concluded that the population that undergoes SOCE tends to have strongly conservative religious views that lead them to seek to change their sexual orientation. Thus, the appropriate application of affirmative therapeutic interventions for those who seek SOCE involves therapist acceptance, support, and understanding of clients and the facilitation of clients' active coping, social support, and identity exploration and development, without imposing a specific sexual orientation identity outcome.

In 2012, the Pan American Health Organization (the North and South American branch of the World Health Organization) released a statement cautioning against services that purport to "cure" people with non-heterosexual sexual orientations, as they lack medical justification, and represent a threat to the health and well-being of affected people. They noted that the global scientific and professional consensus is that homosexuality is a normal and natural variation of human sexuality and cannot be regarded as a pathological condition. The Pan American Health Organization further called on governments, academic institutions, professional associations and the media to expose these practices and to promote respect for diversity. The World Health Organization affiliate further noted that gay minors have sometimes been forced to attend these "therapies" involuntarily, being deprived of their liberty and sometimes kept in isolation for several months. Additionally, the Pan American Health Organization recommended that such malpractices be denounced and subject to sanctions and penalties under national legislation, as they constitute a violation of the ethical principles of health care and violate human rights that are protected by international and regional agreements.

The National Association for Research & Therapy of Homosexuality (NARTH), which described itself as a "professional, scientific organization that offers hope to those who struggle with unwanted homosexuality", disagreed with the mainstream mental health community's position on conversion therapy, both on its effectiveness and by describing sexual orientation not as a binary immutable quality, or as a disease, but as a continuum of intensities of sexual attractions and emotional affect. The American Psychological Association and the Royal College of Psychiatrists expressed concerns that the positions espoused by NARTH are not supported by the science and create an environment in which prejudice and discrimination can flourish.

== Assessment and measurement ==
Varying definitions and strong social norms about sexuality can make sexual orientation difficult to quantify.

=== Early classification schemes ===
One of the earliest sexual orientation classification schemes was proposed in the 1860s by Karl Heinrich Ulrichs in a series of pamphlets he published privately. The classification scheme, which was meant only to describe males, separated them into three basic categories: dionings, urnings and uranodionings. An urning can be further categorized by degree of effeminacy. These categories directly correspond with the categories of sexual orientation used today: heterosexual, homosexual, and bisexual. In the series of pamphlets, Ulrichs outlined a set of questions to determine if a man was an urning. The definitions of each category of Ulrichs' classification scheme are as follows:

- Dioning – Comparable to the modern term "heterosexual"

- Urning – Comparable to the modern term "homosexual"

Mannling – A manly urning
Weibling – An effeminate urning
Zwischen – A somewhat manly and somewhat effeminate urning
Virilised – An urning that sexually behaves like a dioning

- Urano-Dioning – Comparable to the modern term "bisexual"

From at least the late nineteenth century in Europe, there was speculation that the range of human sexual response looked more like a continuum than two or three discrete categories. Berlin sexologist Magnus Hirschfeld published a scheme in 1896 that measured the strength of an individual's sexual desire on two independent 10-point scales, A (homosexual) and B (heterosexual). A heterosexual individual may be A0, B5; a homosexual individual may be A5, B0; an asexual would be A0, B0; and someone with an intense attraction to both sexes would be A9, B9.

=== Kinsey scale ===
The Kinsey scale, also called the Heterosexual-Homosexual Rating Scale, was first published in Sexual Behavior in the Human Male (1948) by Alfred Kinsey, Wardell Pomeroy, and Clyde Martin and also featured in Sexual Behavior in the Human Female (1953). The scale was developed to combat the assumption at the time that people are either heterosexual or homosexual and that these two types represent antitheses in the sexual world. Recognizing that a significant portion of the population is not completely heterosexual or homosexual and that such people can experience both heterosexual and homosexual behavior and psychic responses, Kinsey et al., stated:

Males do not represent two discrete populations, heterosexual and homosexual. The world is not to be divided into sheep and goats. Not all things are black nor all things white... The living world is a continuum in each and every one of its aspects. The sooner we learn this concerning human sexual behavior, the sooner we shall reach a sound understanding of the realities of sex.

— Kinsey et al. (1948) p. 639.

The Kinsey scale provides a classification of sexual orientation based on the relative amounts of heterosexual and homosexual experience or psychic response in one's history at a given time. The classification scheme works such that individuals in the same category show the same balance between the heterosexual and homosexual elements in their histories. The position on the scale is based on the relation of heterosexuality to homosexuality in one's history, rather than the actual amount of overt experience or psychic response. An individual can be assigned a position on the scale in accordance with the following definitions of the points of the scale:

| Rating | Description |
|---|---|
| 0 | Exclusively heterosexual. Individuals make no physical contact which results in erotic arousal or orgasm and make no psychic responses to individuals of their own sex. |
| 1 | Predominantly heterosexual/incidentally homosexual. Individuals have only incidental homosexual contacts which have involved physical or psychic response or incidental psychic response without physical contact. |
| 2 | Predominantly heterosexual but more than incidentally homosexual. Individuals have more than incidental homosexual experience or respond rather definitely to homosexual stimuli. |
| 3 | Equally heterosexual and homosexual. Individuals are about equally homosexual and heterosexual in their experiences or psychic reactions. |
| 4 | Predominantly homosexual but more than incidentally heterosexual. Individuals have more overt activity or psychic reactions in the homosexual while still maintaining a fair amount of heterosexual activity or responding rather definitively to heterosexual contact. |
| 5 | Predominantly homosexual/only incidentally heterosexual. Individuals are almost entirely homosexual in their activities or reactions. |
| 6 | Exclusively homosexual. Individuals who are exclusively homosexual, both in regard to their overt experience and in regard to their psychic reactions. |

The Kinsey scale has been praised for dismissing the dichotomous classification of sexual orientation and allowing for a new perspective on human sexuality. Despite seven categories being able to provide a more accurate description of sexual orientation than a dichotomous scale, it is still difficult to determine which category individuals should be assigned to. In a major study comparing sexual response in homosexual males and females, Masters and Johnson discuss the difficulty of assigning the Kinsey ratings to participants. Particularly, they found it difficult to determine the relative amount heterosexual and homosexual experience and response in a person's history when using the scale. They report finding it difficult to assign ratings 2–4 for individuals with a large number of heterosexual and homosexual experiences. When there are a substantial number of heterosexual and homosexual experiences in one's history, it becomes difficult for that individual to be fully objective in assessing the relative amount of each.

Weinrich et al. (1993) and Weinberg et al. (1994) criticized the scale for lumping individuals who are different based on different dimensions of sexuality into the same categories. When applying the scale, Kinsey considered two dimensions of sexual orientation: overt sexual experience and psychosexual reactions. Valuable information was lost by collapsing the two values into one final score. A person who has only predominantly same sex reactions is different from someone with relatively little reaction but much same sex experience. It would have been quite simple for Kinsey to have measured the two dimensions separately and report scores independently to avoid loss of information. Furthermore, there are more than two dimensions of sexuality to be considered. Beyond behavior and reactions, one could also assess attraction, identification, lifestyle, etc. This is addressed by the Klein Sexual Orientation Grid.

A third concern with the Kinsey scale is that it inappropriately measures heterosexuality and homosexuality on the same scale, making one a tradeoff of the other. Research in the 1970s on masculinity and femininity found that concepts of masculinity and femininity are more appropriately measured as independent concepts on a separate scale rather than as a single continuum, with each end representing opposite extremes. When compared on the same scale, they act as tradeoffs such, whereby to be more feminine one had to be less masculine and vice versa. However, if they are considered as separate dimensions one can be simultaneously very masculine and very feminine. Similarly, considering heterosexuality and homosexuality on separate scales would allow one to be both very heterosexual and very homosexual or not very much of either. When they are measured independently, the degree of heterosexual and homosexual can be independently determined, rather than the balance between heterosexual and homosexual as determined using the Kinsey Scale.

=== Klein Sexual Orientation Grid ===
In response to the criticism of the Kinsey scale only measuring two dimensions of sexual orientation, Fritz Klein developed the Klein sexual orientation grid (KSOG), a multidimensional scale for describing sexual orientation. Introduced in Klein's book The Bisexual Option (1978), the KSOG uses a 7-point scale to assess seven different dimensions of sexuality at three different points in an individual's life: past (from early adolescence up to one year ago), present (within the last 12 months), and ideal (what the individual would choose if it were completely their choice).

=== The Sell Assessment of Sexual Orientation ===
The Sell Assessment of Sexual Orientation (SASO) was developed to address the major concerns with the Kinsey Scale and Klein Sexual Orientation Grid and as such, measures sexual orientation on a continuum, considers various dimensions of sexual orientation, and considers homosexuality and heterosexuality separately. Rather than providing a final solution to the question of how to best measure sexual orientation, the SASO is meant to provoke discussion and debate about measurements of sexual orientation.

The SASO consists of 12 questions. Six of these questions assess sexual attraction, four assess sexual behavior, and two assess sexual orientation identity. For each question on the scale that measures homosexuality there is a corresponding question that measures heterosexuality giving six matching pairs of questions. Taken all together, the six pairs of questions and responses provide a profile of an individual's sexual orientation. However, results can be further simplified into four summaries that look specifically at responses that correspond to either homosexuality, heterosexuality, bisexuality or asexuality.

Of all the questions on the scale, Sell considered those assessing sexual attraction to be the most important as sexual attraction is a better reflection of the concept of sexual orientation which he defined as "extent of sexual attractions toward members of the other, same, both sexes or neither" than either sexual identity or sexual behavior. Identity and behavior are measured as supplemental information because they are both closely tied to sexual attraction and sexual orientation. Major criticisms of the SASO have not been established, but a concern is that the reliability and validity remains largely unexamined.

=== Difficulties with assessment ===
Research focusing on sexual orientation uses scales of assessment to identify who belongs in which sexual population group. It is assumed that these scales will be able to reliably identify and categorize people by their sexual orientation. However, it is difficult to determine an individual's sexual orientation through scales of assessment, due to ambiguity regarding the definition of sexual orientation. Generally, there are three components of sexual orientation used in assessment. Their definitions and examples of how they may be assessed are as follows:

| Component | Definition | Questions |
|---|---|---|
| Sexual attraction | Attraction toward one sex or the desire to have sexual relations or to be in a primary loving, sexual relationship with one or both sexes | "Have you ever had a romantic attraction to a male? Have you ever had a romantic attraction to a female?" |
| Sexual behavior | "Any mutually voluntary activity with another person that involves genital contact and sexual excitement or arousal, that is, feeling really turned on, even if intercourse or orgasm did not occur" | "Have you ever had a relationship with someone of your own sex which resulted in sexual orgasm?" |
| Sexual identity | Personally selected, socially and historically bound labels attached to the perceptions and meaning individuals have about their sexual identity. | "Pick from these six options: gay or lesbian; bisexual, but mostly gay or lesbian; bisexual equally gay/lesbian and heterosexual; bisexual but mostly heterosexual; heterosexual; and uncertain, don't know for sure." |

Though sexual attraction, behavior, and identity are all components of sexual orientation, if a person defined by one of these dimensions were congruent with those defined by another dimension it would not matter which was used in assessing orientation, but this is not the case. There is "little coherent relationship between the amount and mix of homosexual and heterosexual behavior in a person's biography and that person's choice to label himself or herself as bisexual, homosexual, or heterosexual". Individuals typically experience diverse attractions and behaviors that may reflect curiosity, experimentation, social pressure and is not necessarily indicative of an underlying sexual orientation. For example, a woman may have fantasies or thoughts about sex with other women but never act on these thoughts and only have sex with opposite gender partners. If sexual orientation was being assessed based on one's sexual attraction then this individual would be considered homosexual, but her behavior indicates heterosexuality.

As there is no research indicating which of the three components is essential in defining sexual orientation, all three are used independently and provide different conclusions regarding sexual orientation. Savin Williams (2006) discusses this issue and notes that by basing findings regarding sexual orientation on a single component, researchers may not actually capture the intended population. For example, if homosexual is defined by same sex behavior, gay virgins are omitted, heterosexuals engaging in same sex behavior for other reasons than preferred sexual arousal are miscounted, and those with same sex attraction who only have opposite-sex relations are excluded. Because of the limited populations that each component captures, consumers of research should be cautious in generalizing these findings.

One of the uses for scales that assess sexual orientation is determining what the prevalence of different sexual orientations are within a population. Depending on subject's age, culture and sex, the prevalence rates of homosexuality vary depending on which component of sexual orientation is being assessed: sexual attraction, sexual behavior, or sexual identity. Assessing sexual attraction will yield the greatest prevalence of homosexuality in a population whereby the proportion of individuals indicating they are same sex attracted is two to three times greater than the proportion reporting same sex behavior or identify as gay, lesbian, or bisexual. Furthermore, reports of same sex behavior usually exceed those of gay, lesbian, or bisexual identification. The following chart demonstrates how widely the prevalence of homosexuality can vary depending on what age, location and component of sexual orientation is being assessed:

Prevalence of homosexuality
| | Attraction | | Behaviour | | Identity | |
|---|---|---|---|---|---|---|
| Country: Age group | Female | Male | Female | Male | Female | Male |
| US: Youth | 6% | 3% | 11% | 5% | 8% | 3% |
| US: Young adults | 13% | 5% | 4% | 3% | 4% | 3% |
| US: Adults | 8% | 8% | 4% | 9% | 1% | 2% |
| Australia: Adults | 17% | 15% | 8% | 16% | 4% | 7% |
| Turkey: Young adults | 7% | 6% | 4% | 5% | 2% | 2% |
| Norway: Adolescents | 21% | 9% | 7% | 6% | 5% | 5% |

The variance in prevalence rates is reflected in people's inconsistent responses to the different components of sexual orientation within a study and the instability of their responses over time. Laumann et al. (1994) found that among U.S. adults 20% of those who would be considered homosexual on one component of orientation were homosexual on the other two dimensions and 70% responded in a way that was consistent with homosexuality on only one of the three dimensions. Furthermore, sexuality may be fluid; for example, a person's sexual orientation identity is not necessarily stable or consistent over time but is subject to change throughout life. Diamond (2003) found that over seven years, two-thirds of the women changed their sexual identity at least once, with many reporting that the label was not adequate in capturing the diversity of their sexual or romantic feelings. Furthermore, women who relinquished bisexual and lesbian identification did not relinquish same sex sexuality and acknowledged the possibility for future same sex attractions or behaviour. One woman stated "I'm mainly straight but I'm one of those people who, if the right circumstance came along, would change my viewpoint". Therefore, individuals classified as homosexual in one study might not be identified the same way in another depending on which components are assessed and when the assessment is made making it difficult to pin point who is homosexual and who is not and what the overall prevalence within a population may be.

==== Implications ====
Depending on which component of sexual orientation is being assessed and referenced, different conclusions can be drawn about the prevalence rate of homosexuality which has real world consequences. Knowing how much of the population is made up of homosexual individuals influences how this population may be seen or treated by the public and government bodies. For example, if homosexual individuals constitute only 1% of the general population they are politically easier to ignore or than if they are known to be a constituency that surpasses most ethnic and minority groups. If the number is relatively minor then it is difficult to argue for community based same sex programs and services, mass media inclusion of gay role models, or Gay/Straight Alliances in schools. For this reason, in the 1970s, Bruce Voeller, the chair of the National Gay and Lesbian Task Force, perpetuated a common myth that the prevalence of homosexuality is 10% for the whole population by averaging a 13% number for men and a 7% number for women. Voeller generalized this finding and used it as part of the modern gay rights movement to convince politicians and the public that "we [gays and lesbians] are everywhere".

==== Proposed solutions ====
In the paper "Who's Gay? Does It Matter?", psychologist Ritch Savin-Williams proposes two different approaches to assessing sexual orientation until well positioned and psychometrically sound and tested definitions are developed that would allow research to reliably identify the prevalence, causes, and consequences of homosexuality. He first suggests that greater priority should be given to sexual arousal and attraction over behaviour and identity because it is less prone to self- and other-deception, social conditions and variable meanings. To measure attraction and arousal he proposed that biological measures should be developed and used. There are numerous biological/physiological measures that exist that can measure sexual orientation such as sexual arousal, brain scans, eye tracking, body odour preference, and anatomical variations such as digit-length ratio and right or left-handedness. Secondly, Savin-Williams suggests that researchers should forsake the general notion of sexual orientation altogether and assess only those components that are relevant to the research question being investigated. For example:

- To assess STIs or HIV transmission, measure sexual behaviour
- To assess interpersonal attachments, measure sexual/romantic attraction
- To assess political ideology, measure sexual identity

=== Means of assessment ===
Means typically used include surveys, interviews, cross-cultural studies, physical arousal measurements sexual behavior, sexual fantasy, or a pattern of erotic arousal. The most common is verbal self-reporting or self-labeling, which depend on respondents being accurate about themselves.

==== Sexual arousal ====
Studying human sexual arousal has proved a fruitful way of understanding how men and women differ as genders and in terms of sexual orientation. A clinical measurement may use penile or vaginal photoplethysmography, where genital engorgement with blood is measured in response to exposure to different erotic material.

Some researchers who study sexual orientation argue that the concept may apply differently for men and women. A study of sexual arousal patterns found that women, when viewing erotic films which show female-female, male-male and male-female sexual activity (oral sex or penetration), have patterns of arousal which do not match their declared sexual orientations as well as men's. That is, heterosexual and lesbian women's sexual arousal to erotic films do not differ significantly by the genders of the participants (male or female) or by the type of sexual activity (heterosexual or homosexual). Men's sexual arousal patterns tend to be more in line with their stated orientations, with heterosexual men showing more penis arousal to female-female sexual activity and less arousal to female-male and male-male sexual stimuli, and homosexual and bisexual men being more aroused by films depicting male-male intercourse and less aroused by other stimuli.

Another study on men and women's patterns of sexual arousal confirmed that men and women have different patterns of arousal, independent of their sexual orientations. The study found that women's genitals become aroused to both human and nonhuman stimuli from movies showing humans of both genders having sex (heterosexual and homosexual) and from videos showing non-human primates (bonobos) having sex. Men did not show any sexual arousal to non-human visual stimuli, their arousal patterns being in line with their specific sexual interest (women for heterosexual men and men for homosexual men).

These studies suggest that men and women are different in terms of sexual arousal patterns and that this is also reflected in how their genitals react to sexual stimuli of both genders or even to non-human stimuli. Sexual orientation has many dimensions (attractions, behavior, identity), of which sexual arousal is the only product of sexual attractions which can be measured at present with some degree of physical precision. Thus, the fact that women are aroused by seeing non-human primates having sex does not mean that women's sexual orientation includes this type of sexual interest. Some researchers argue that women's sexual orientation depends less on their patterns of sexual arousal than men's and that other components of sexual orientation (like emotional attachment) must be taken into account when describing women's sexual orientations. In contrast, men's sexual orientations tend to be primarily focused on the physical component of attractions and, thus, their sexual feelings are more exclusively oriented according to sex.

More recently, scientists have started to focus on measuring changes in brain activity related to sexual arousal, by using brain-scanning techniques. A study on how heterosexual and homosexual men's brains react to seeing pictures of naked men and women has found that both hetero- and homosexual men react positively to seeing their preferred sex, using the same brain regions. The only significant group difference between these orientations was found in the amygdala, a brain region known to be involved in regulating fear.

== Culture ==
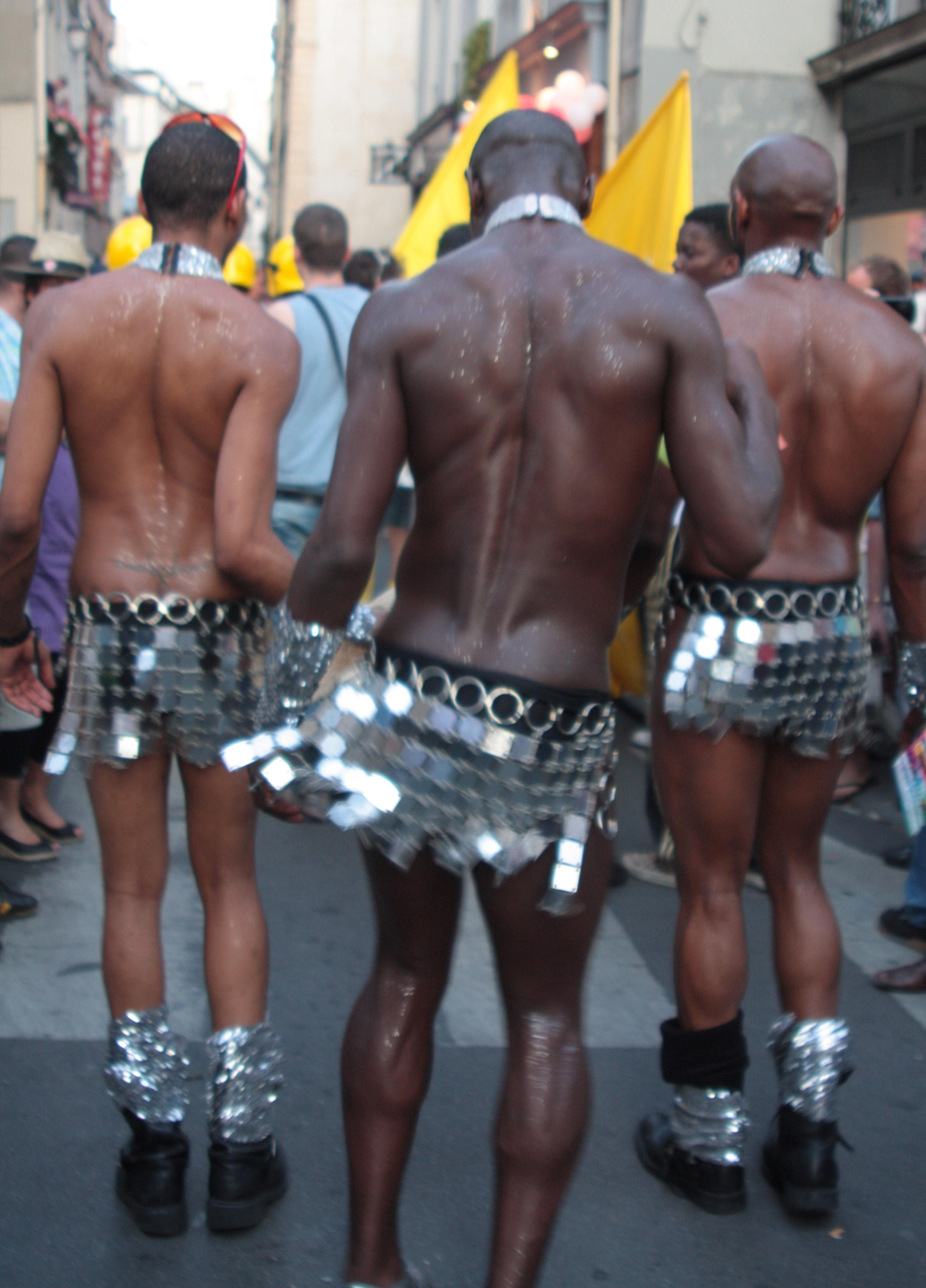
Gay Pride, Paris 2009

Research suggests that sexual orientation is independent of cultural and other social influences, but that open identification of one's sexual orientation may be hindered by homophobic/heterosexist settings. Social systems such as religion, language and ethnic traditions can have a powerful impact on realization of sexual orientation. Influences of culture may complicate the process of measuring sexual orientation. The majority of empirical and clinical research on LGBTQ+ populations are done with largely white, middle-class, well-educated samples; however, there are pockets of research that document various other cultural groups, although these are frequently limited in diversity of gender and sexual orientation of the subjects. Integration of sexual orientation with sociocultural identity may be a challenge for LGBTQ+ individuals. Individuals may or may not consider their sexual orientation to define their sexual identity, as they may experience various degrees of fluidity of sexuality, or may simply identify more strongly with another aspect of their identity such as family role. American culture puts a great emphasis on individual attributes, and views the self as unchangeable and constant. In contrast, East Asian cultures put a great emphasis on a person's social role within social hierarchies, and view the self as fluid and malleable. These differing cultural perspectives have many implications on cognition of the self, including perception of sexual orientation.

=== Language ===
Translation is a major obstacle when comparing different cultures. Many English terms lack equivalents in other languages, while concepts and words from other languages fail to be reflected in the English language. Translation and vocabulary obstacles are not limited to the English language. Language can force individuals to identify with a label that may or may not accurately reflect their true sexual orientation. Language can also be used to signal sexual orientation to others. The meaning of words referencing categories of sexual orientation are negotiated in the mass media in relation to social organization. New words may be brought into use to describe new terms or better describe complex interpretations of sexual orientation. Other words may pick up new layers or meaning. For example, the heterosexual Spanish terms marido and mujer for "husband" and "wife", respectively, have recently been replaced in Spain by the gender-neutral terms cónyuges or consortes meaning "spouses".

=== Perceptions ===
A video by the Welsh government portraying hate crimes based upon sexual orientation

One person may presume knowledge of another person's sexual orientation based upon perceived characteristics, such as appearance, clothing, voice (cf. Gay male speech), and accompaniment by and behavior with other people. The attempt to detect sexual orientation in social situations is sometimes colloquially known as gaydar; some studies have found that guesses based on face photos perform better than chance. 2015 research suggests that "gaydar" is an alternate label for using LGBTQ stereotypes to infer orientation, and that face-shape is not an accurate indication of orientation.

Perceived sexual orientation may affect how a person is treated. For instance, in the United States, the FBI reported that 15.6% of hate crimes reported to police in 2004 were "because of a sexual-orientation bias". Under the UK Employment Equality (Sexual Orientation) Regulations 2003, as explained by Advisory, Conciliation and Arbitration Service, "workers or job applicants must not be treated less favourably because of their sexual orientation, their perceived sexual orientation or because they associate with someone of a particular sexual orientation".

In Euro-American cultures, norms, values, traditions and laws facilitate heterosexuality, including constructs of marriage and family. Efforts are being made to change prejudiced attitudes, and legislation is being passed to promote equality.

Some other cultures do not recognize a homosexual/heterosexual/bisexual distinction. It is common to distinguish a person's sexuality according to their sexual role (active/passive; insertive/penetrated). In this distinction, the passive role is typically associated with femininity or inferiority, while the active role is typically associated with masculinity or superiority. For example, an investigation of a small Brazilian fishing village revealed three sexual categories for men: men who have sex only with men (consistently in a passive role), men who have sex only with women, and men who have sex with women and men (consistently in an active role). While men who consistently occupied the passive role were recognized as a distinct group by locals, men who have sex with only women, and men who have sex with women and men, were not differentiated. Little is known about same-sex attracted females, or sexual behavior between females in these cultures.

=== Racism and ethnically relevant support ===
In the United States, non-Caucasian LGBTQ individuals may find themselves in a double minority, where they are neither fully accepted or understood by mainly Caucasian LGBTQ communities, nor are they accepted by their own ethnic group. Many people experience racism in the dominant LGBTQ community where racial stereotypes merge with gender stereotypes, such that Asian-American LGBTQ people are viewed as more passive and feminine, while African-American LGBTQ people are viewed as more masculine and aggressive. There are a number of culturally specific support networks for LGBTQ individuals active in the United States. For example, "Ô-Môi" for Vietnamese American queer females.

=== Religion ===
Sexuality in the context of religion is often a controversial subject, especially that of sexual orientation. In the past, various sects have viewed homosexuality from a negative point of view and had punishments for same-sex relationships. In modern times, an increasing number of religions and religious denominations accept homosexuality. It is possible to integrate sexual identity and religious identity, depending on the interpretation of religious texts.

Some religious organizations object to the concept of sexual orientation entirely. In the 2014 revision of the code of ethics of the American Association of Christian Counselors, members are forbidden to "describe or reduce human identity and nature to sexual orientation or reference", even while counselors must acknowledge the client's fundamental right to self-determination.

=== Internet and media ===
The Internet has influenced sexual orientation in two ways: it is a common mode of discourse on the subject of sexual orientation and sexual identity, and therefore shapes popular conceptions; and it allows anonymous attainment of sexual partners, as well as facilitates communication and connection between greater numbers of people.

== Demographics ==
Modern scientific surveys find that, across cultures, most people report a heterosexual orientation. Bisexuality comes in varying degrees of relative attraction to the same or opposite sex. Men are more likely to be exclusively homosexual than to be equally attracted to both sexes, while the opposite is true for women.

Surveys in Western cultures find, on average, that about 93% of men and 87% of women identify as completely heterosexual, 4% of men and 10% of women as mostly heterosexual, 0.5% of men and 1% of women as evenly bisexual, 0.5% of men and 0.5% of women as mostly homosexual, and 2% of men and 0.5% of women as completely homosexual. An analysis of 67 studies found that the lifetime prevalence of sex between men (regardless of orientation) was 3-5% for East Asia, 6-12% for South and South East Asia, 6-15% for Eastern Europe, and 6-20% for Latin America. The International HIV/AIDS Alliance estimates a worldwide prevalence of men who have sex with men between 3 and 16%.

The relative percentage of the population that reports a homosexual or bisexual orientation can vary with different methodologies and selection criteria. A 1998 report stated that these statistical findings are in the range of 2.8 to 9% for males, and 1 to 5% for females for the United States – this figure can be as high as 12% for some large cities and as low as 1% for rural areas.

A small percentage of people are not sexually attracted to anyone (asexuality). A study in 2004 placed the prevalence of asexuality at 1%.

=== Kinsey data ===
In Sexual Behavior in the Human Male (1948) and Sexual Behavior in the Human Female (1953), by Alfred C. Kinsey et al., people were asked about their sexual behaviors and then assigned a rating by the researchers on a scale from completely heterosexual to completely homosexual. Kinsey reported that when the individuals' behavior, as well as their identity, are analyzed, a significant number of people appeared to be at least somewhat bisexual – i.e., they have some attraction to either sex, although usually one sex is preferred. Kinsey's methods have been criticized as flawed, particularly with regard to the randomness of his sample population, which included prison inmates, male prostitutes and those who willingly participated in discussion of previously taboo sexual topics. Nevertheless, Paul Gebhard, subsequent director of the Kinsey Institute for Sex Research, reexamined the data in the Kinsey Reports and concluded that removing the prison inmates and prostitutes barely affected the results. More recent researchers believe that Kinsey overestimated the rate of same-sex attraction because of flaws in his sampling methods.

== Social constructionism ==
Because sexual orientation is complex, some academics and researchers, especially in queer studies, have argued that it is a historical and social construction. In 1976, philosopher and historian Michel Foucault argued in The History of Sexuality that homosexuality as an identity did not exist in the eighteenth century; that people instead spoke of "sodomy", which referred to sexual acts. Sodomy was a crime that was often ignored, but sometimes punished severely under sodomy laws. He wrote, "'Sexuality' is an invention of the modern state, the industrial revolution, and capitalism." Other scholars argue that there are significant continuities between ancient and modern homosexuality. The philosopher of science Michael Ruse has stated that the social constructionist approach, which is influenced by Foucault, is based on a selective reading of the historical record that confuses the existence of homosexual people with the way in which they are labelled or treated.

In much of the modern world, sexual identity is defined based on the sex of one's partner. In some parts of the world, however, sexuality is often socially defined based on sexual roles, whether one is a penetrator or is penetrated. In Western cultures, people speak meaningfully of gay, lesbian, and bisexual identities and communities. In some other cultures, homosexuality and heterosexual labels do not emphasize an entire social identity or indicate community affiliation based on sexual orientation.

Some historians and researchers argue that the emotional and affectionate activities associated with sexual-orientation terms such as "gay" and "heterosexual" change significantly over time and across cultural boundaries. For example, in many English-speaking nations, it is assumed that same-sex kissing, particularly between men, is a sign of homosexuality, whereas various types of same-sex kissing are common expressions of friendship in other nations. Also, many modern and historic cultures have formal ceremonies expressing long-term commitment between same-sex friends, even though homosexuality itself is taboo within the cultures.

== Law, politics and theology ==
Professor Michael King stated, "The conclusion reached by scientists who have investigated the origins and stability of sexual orientation is that it is a human characteristic that is formed early in life, and is resistant to change. Scientific evidence on the origins of homosexuality is considered relevant to theological and social debate because it undermines suggestions that sexual orientation is a choice."

In 1999, law professor David Cruz wrote that "sexual orientation (and the related concept homosexuality) might plausibly refer to a variety of different attributes, singly or in combination. What is not immediately clear is whether one conception is most suited to all social, legal, and constitutional purposes."

== See also ==
- Ascribed characteristics
- Fundamental Rights Agency
- Genetic diagnosis of intersex
- LGBTQ rights by country or territory
- List of anti-discrimination acts
- Romantic orientation
- Sexual desire
- Sexual orientation and gender identity at the United Nations
- Sexual orientation and military service
- Sexual orientation hypothesis
- Sociosexual orientation
- Terminology of homosexuality
