= BiPhoria =

Bisexual organisation in England

BiPhoria is social and support group for bisexual people in Manchester, England. It is the oldest extant bisexual organisation in the UK, having launched in 1994. As its central mission since then it has welcomed people who are just coming out or new to the area to have opportunities to meet and talk with other bisexuals, and those who are questioning their sexual orientation who think they may be bisexual.

As the only bi-specific organisation in the North West of England for much of the time since its formation, its work has extended beyond the city of Manchester including sparking similar groups in other cities including Birmingham, Edinburgh, Leeds and Liverpool.

The group's aim is to provide space and voice for bisexual people and to facilitate the development of a cohesive bisexual community in Manchester and across the North West. The group works to promote bisexual visibility, to protect the bisexual community from discrimination and biphobia and assists and empowers the individual community members, their families and friends to live fuller and happier lives.

It has been shortlisted for a number of LGBT related awards and took fifth place for Best LGBT Group in the Pink Paper's 2010 reader awards.

== History ==
The first meeting was on 1 September 1994 at the Lesbian and Gay Centre on Sidney Street. In September 2000 main meetings moved to the LGBT Foundation, at the time called the Lesbian & Gay Foundation.

By 1997 it had its own webpage as part of the then Bi.org worldwide bisexual site, and in 2003 it was the first UK bisexual group to acquire its own web domain, biphoria.org.uk.

== Services ==
In addition to its core social-support meetings, BiPhoria provides support to the bisexual community, including a website and links to resources, outreach work and research publications.

Like other UK bi organisations, its work covers the broad "bisexual umbrella" of people who are attracted to people of more than one gender - whichever they prefer amongst labels like bisexual, pansexual, omnisexual, or multisexual.

== Publications ==
- In 2003 BiPhoria published the Bisexual Life report, identifying bisexual community priorities for the local council based on focus group interviews.
- In 2010 as part of work with local NHS services a guide to "Bisexuality and Mental Health".
- In 2011 the booklet "Getting Bi In A Gay / Straight World" was published, a 24-page guide to coming out and staying out as bisexual. Further editions followed in 2014 and 2017.
- In 2013 the "BiCon Survey" explored the backgrounds and motivations of people who attend bisexual community events in the UK.

== Awards ==
The group has been shortlisted for a number of LGBT community awards.

- The Bolton Pride Awards 2016 saw BiPhoria shortlisted for best support group.
- In 2015 it was shortlisted for Best LGBT Support Group in the ShoutOut awards.
- The 2015 Inclusive Networks awards shortlisted BiPhoria for best network.
- The European Diversity Awards in 2015 saw BiPhoria shortlisted for Community Group of the Year.
- In 2009 the group was shortlisted for Best Local Group in the Pink Paper Readers' Awards

== See also ==
- Bisexual community
