= Bisexual theory =

Field of critical theory

Bisexual theory is a field of critical theory, inspired by queer theory and bisexual politics, that foregrounds bisexuality as both a theoretical focus and as an epistemology. Bisexual theory emerged most prominently in the 1990s, in response to the burgeoning field of queer theory, and queer studies more broadly, frequently employing similar post-structuralist approaches but redressing queer theory's tendency towards bisexual erasure.

In their critique of the frequent elision of bisexuality in queer theory, Serena Anderlini-D'Onofrio and Jonathan Alexander write, "a queer theory that misses bisexuality's querying of normative sexualities is itself too mastered by the very normative and normalizing binaries it seeks to unsettle".

Scholars who have been discussed in relation to bisexual theory include Ibrahim Abdurrahman Farajajé, Steven Angelides, Elisabeth Däumer, Jo Eadie, Shiri Eisner, Marjorie Garber, Donald E. Hall, Clare Hemmings, Michael du Plessis, Maria Pramaggiore, Merl Storr, and Kenji Yoshino.

== History ==
Bisexual theory emerged in the 1990s, inspired by and responding to the emergence of queer theory. Elisabeth Däumer's 1992 article, "Queer Ethics; or, the Challenge of Bisexuality to Lesbian Ethics", was the first major publication to theorise bisexuality in relation to queer and feminist theory.

In 1993, at the 11th National Bisexual Conference in the UK, a group of bisexual scholars formed Bi Academic Intervention. The same group published a volume of bisexual theory in 1997, entitled The Bisexual Imaginary: Representation, Identity and Desire. In 1995, Marjorie Garber released Vice Versa: Bisexuality and the Eroticism of Everyday Life, a monograph that aimed to reveal a 'bi-erotics' observable across disparate cultural locations, which however, drew some criticism due to its alleged ahistoricism. In 1996, Maria Pramaggiore and Donald E. Hall edited the collection RePresenting Bisexualities: Subjects and Cultures of Fluid Desire, which turned a bisexual theoretical lens to questions of representation. Chapters of bisexual theory also appeared in Activating Theory: Lesbian, Gay Bisexual Politics (1993) and Queer Studies: A Lesbian, Gay, Bisexual, and Transgender Anthology (1996).

The Journal of Bisexuality was first published in 2000 by the Taylor & Francis Group under the Routledge imprint, and its editors-in-chief have included Fritz Klein, Jonathan Alexander, Brian Zamboni, James D. Weinrich, and M. Paz Galupo.

In 2000, law scholar Kenji Yoshino published the influential article "The Epistemic Contract of Bisexual Erasure", which argues that "Straights and gays have an investment in stabilizing sexual orientation categories. The shared aspect of this investment is the security that all individuals draw from rigid social orderings." In 2001, Steven Angelides published A History of Bisexuality, in which he argues that bisexuality has operated historically as a structural other to sexual identity itself. In 2002, Clare Hemmings published Bisexual Spaces: A Geography of Sexuality and Gender in which she explores bisexuality's functions in geographical, political, theoretical, and cultural spaces.

In 2004, Jonathan Alexander and Karen Yescavage co-edited Bisexuality and Transgenderism: InterSEXions of the Others, which considers the intersections of bisexual and transgender identities.

Shiri Eisner's Bi: Notes for a Bisexual Revolution was released in 2013. This radical manifesto combines feminist, transgender, queer, and bisexual activism with theoretical work to establish a blueprint for bisexual revolution.

== Epistemologies ==
One of the ways in which bisexual theorists have deployed bisexuality critically has been the formulation of bisexual epistemologies that ask how bisexuality generates or is given meaning.

Elisabeth Däumer suggests that bisexuality can be "an epistemological as well as ethical vantage point from which we can examine and deconstruct the bipolar framework of gender and sexuality."

Authors like Maria Pramaggiore and Jo Eadie repurposed the idea of bisexual people being "on the fence" in order to theorise an "epistemology of the fence":

a place of in-betweenness and indecision. Often precariously placed atop a structure that divides and demarcates, bisexual epistemologies have the capacity to reframe regimes and regions of desire by defaming and/or reframing in porous, nonexclusive ways... Bisexual epistemologies—ways of apprehending, organizing, and intervening in the world that refuse one-to-one correspondences between sex acts and identity, between erotic objects and sexualities, between identification and desire—acknowledge fluid desires and their continual construction and deconstruction of the desiring subject.

Clare Hemmings outlines three forms that bisexual epistemological approaches have tended to take:

The first locates bisexuality as outside conventional categories of sexuality and gender; the second locates it as critically inside those same categories; and the third focuses on the importance of bisexuality in the discursive formation of "other" identities.

== Critiques ==
In his 1996 article, Jonathan Dollimore observes a trend he terms ‘wishful theory’ in bisexual theoretical work. Dollimore critiques bisexual theory's fabrication of eclectic theoretical narratives with little attention to how they relate to social reality, and its assumption of a subversive position that resists a consideration of how bisexual identity itself might be subverted. Dollimore contends that bisexual theory is "passing, if not closeted, as post-modern theory, safely fashioning itself as a suave doxa."

In her 1999 article, Merl Storr suggests that contemporary bisexual identity, community, organization, and politics are rooted in early postmodernity. By identifying this relation, Storr observes the postmodern themes of indeterminacy, instability, fragmentation, and flux that characterize bisexual theory and parses how these concepts might be reflected upon critically.

One of the problems Clare Hemmings identifies with bisexual epistemological approaches is that bisexuality becomes metaphorized to the point that it is unrecognizable to bisexual people, a critique that has also been made in transgender studies to the allegorization of trans feminine realities.
