= Bisexual erasure =

Dismissing or misrepresenting bisexuals in the public perception

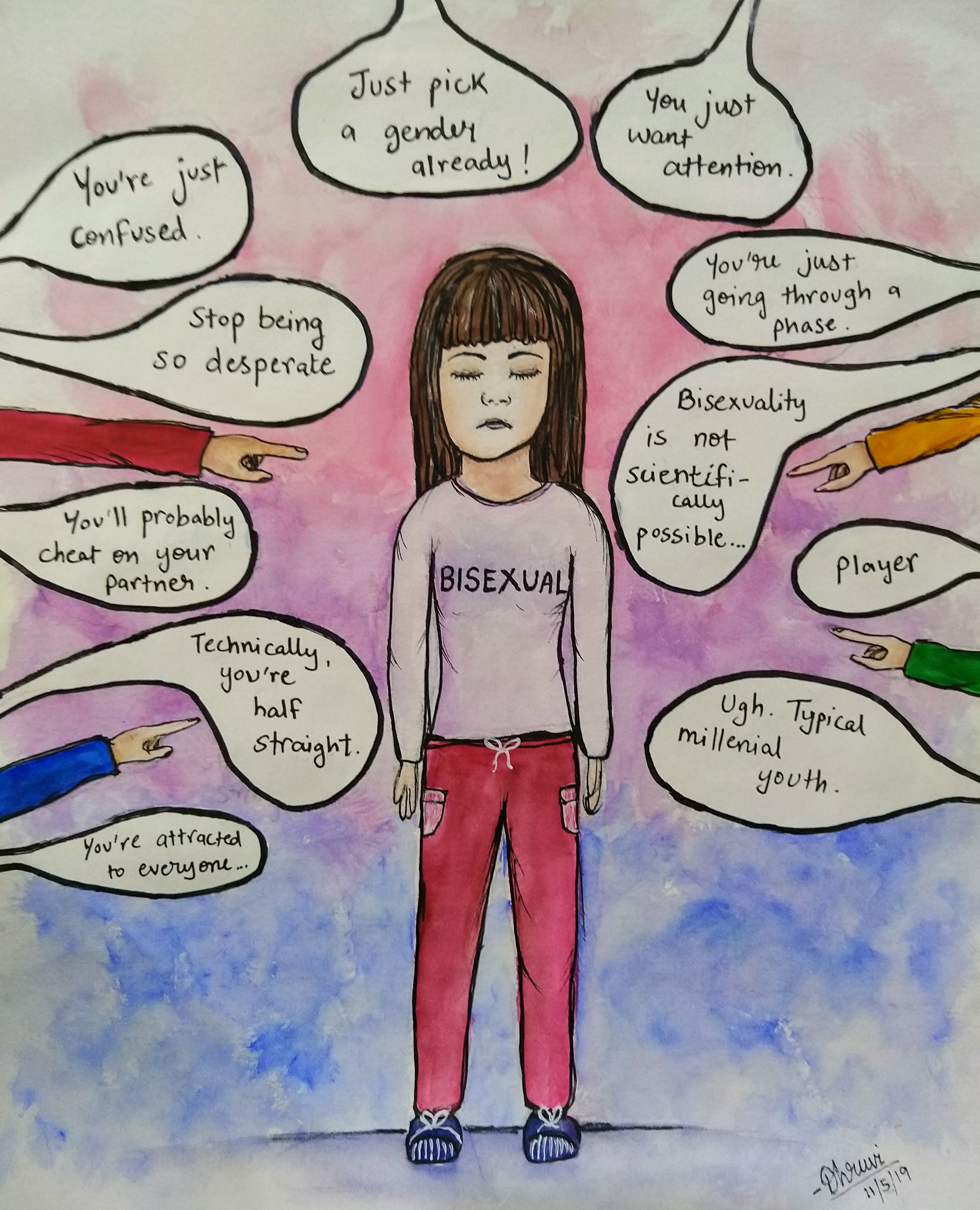
An illustration of examples of various social stigmas against bisexual people

Bisexual erasure (or bi erasure), also called bisexual invisibility, is the tendency to ignore, remove, falsify, or re-explain evidence of bisexuality (or similar identities, such as pansexuality) in history, academia, the news media, and other primary sources. Bisexual erasure happens in both heterosexual and LGBTQ+ communities and bisexual identities are often described as just "phases" or "confusion". Bisexual erasure happens when bisexual people are ignored, dismissed, or downplayed. The lack of recognition towards bisexuality affects bisexual individuals in how they see themselves and how others see them. This erasure then can influence a bisexual person's mental health, identity, and visibility in social, political, and legal spaces.

In its most extreme form, bisexual erasure can include the belief that bisexuality itself does not exist and that individuals who identify as bisexual are either heterosexual or homosexual. People who believe that bisexuality does not exist typically claim that bisexuals are simply confused, or in denial, about their own sexuality. In the case of bisexual men, this commonly manifests in a stereotype that bisexual men are simply closeted gay men. Bisexual individuals are also sometimes dismissed or stereotyped as hypersexual.

Bisexual erasure is often a manifestation of biphobia, although it does not necessarily involve overt antagonism. Erasure frequently results in bisexual-identifying individuals experiencing a variety of adverse social encounters, as they not only have to struggle with finding acceptance within general society but also within the LGBTQ community. Bisexual erasure is a form of stigma and leads to adverse mental health consequences for people who identify as bisexual or similar.

There is increasing inclusion and visibility of bisexuals, particularly in the LGBTQ community.

== Causes ==
=== General ===
According to scholar Kenji Yoshino, there are three main investments that motivate both self-identified homosexuals and heterosexuals to erase bisexuality from LGBT culture. The first of these motivations is sexual orientation stabilization, which is argued to relieve people from the anxiety of possibly having their sexual orientation questioned. This motivation reinforces the belief that bisexuals are simply undecided about their bisexuality and are fundamentally either homosexual or heterosexual, and it isolates, marginalizes, and makes bisexuals invisible within the LGBT community. The second motivation is the maintenance of the importance of gender, which is seen as erotically essential to homosexuals and heterosexuals whereas bisexuality appears to challenge this notion. The third motivation is the maintenance of monogamy since a pair or bond is preferred by mainstream culture. However, bisexuals are typically assumed by homosexuals and heterosexuals to be "intrinsically" non-monogamous. Juana María Rodríguez adds to Yoshino's argument and posits bisexuality breaks down traditional understandings of sexuality and the gender binary. Thus, individuals both in the dominant culture and in the queer community resist bisexuality.

In a 2010 article written for the 10th anniversary of Yoshino's piece, Heron Greenesmith argues bisexuality is inherently invisible in the law, even beyond the reach of deliberate erasure. Firstly, she says it is because bisexuality is legally irrelevant to plaintiffs who are presumed to be heterosexual or homosexual unless outed, and secondly when bisexuality is legally relevant, it is erased within the legal culture because it complicates legal arguments that depend on a gender binary nature of sexuality.

American psychologist Beth Firestein writes that since she wrote her first book on bisexuality, in 1996, "bisexuality has gained visibility, although progress is uneven and awareness of bisexuality is still minimal or absent in many of the more remote regions of our country and internationally".

=== Male motivations ===
Richard C. Friedman, an academic psychiatrist who specializes in the psychodynamics of homosexuality, writes in his essay "Denial in the Development of Homosexual Men" that many gay men have experienced sexual fantasies about women or engaged in sex with women and that many straight men have experienced sexual fantasies about men or engaged in sex with men. Despite being bisexual in fantasy and activity, these men identify as "gay" or "straight" rather than as bisexual. This erasure of bisexuality is sometimes caused by denying the significance of an erotic encounter to maintain a person's sexual identity and sense of community; a man might downplay having had sexual fantasies or encounters with a woman to maintain his identity as a "gay man" and his membership in the gay community, or a man might downplay having had sexual fantasies or encounters with a man to maintain his status as a heterosexual man in a heteronormative society.

Writing for Bisexual.org, author and columnist Zachary Zane cites a study showing 20.7% of straight-identified men watched gay pornography and 7.5% reported having sex with a man in the past six months, while 55% of gay-identified men had watched heterosexual pornography and 0.7% reported having sex with a woman in the past six months. He argues some of the straight-identified men are actually gay or bisexual but are erasing their bisexuality due to internalized biphobia and denial to claim a straight identity label. Pointing out the majority of gay-identified men watched heterosexual pornography but few had recent heterosexual sex, he suggests many self-identified gay men have sexual fantasies about women and in an ideal world would be openly bisexual and freely explore sex with women, but society pressures gay men to "pick a side" so those men "subsequently have picked being gay".

Bisexual author and activist Robyn Ochs has argued gay men are less possessive of their "gay" label than lesbians are of their label. She argues there is less hostility to bisexual men who identify as gay than bisexual women who identify as lesbian, there is a great deal of sexual fluidity between gay men and bisexual men, and that consequently more gay-identified men openly admit to being attracted to and having sex with women. However, Ochs also argues many bisexual men identify as gay to politically align themselves with the gay community. She says since coming out is so difficult for gay men, many do not want to come out a second time as bisexual; the existence of male bisexuality can be threatening to some gay men because it raises the possibility they themselves might be bisexual.

Gay male activist Carl Wittman, writing in his "Refugees from Amerika: A Gay Manifesto" (1969), argued gay men should identify as "gay" rather than as "bisexual", even if they sleep with women. Stating gay men should only become bisexual once society accepts homosexuality, he wrote that:

Bisexuality is good; it is the capacity to love people of either sex. The reason so few of us are bisexual is because society made such a big stink about homosexuality that we got forced into seeing ourselves as either straight or non-straight. Also, many gays go turned off to the ways men are supposed to act with women and vice-versa, which is pretty fucked-up. Gays will begin to turn on to women when 1) it's something that we do because we want to, and not because we should, and 2) when women's liberation changes the nature of heterosexual relationships. We continue to call ourselves homosexual, not bisexual, even if we do make it with the opposite sex also, because saying "Oh, I'm Bi" is a copout for a gay. We get told it's OK to sleep with guys as long as we sleep with women, too, and that's still putting homosexuality down. We'll be gay until everyone has forgotten that it's an issue. Then we'll begin to be complete.

— Refugees from Amerika: A Gay Manifesto I.3

== In heterosexual and LGBTQ communities ==
Heterosexual and gay people who engage in bisexual erasure may claim that bisexuals are either exclusively homosexual (gay/lesbian) or exclusively heterosexual, closeted gay or lesbian people who wish to appear heterosexual, or are heterosexuals who are experimenting with their sexuality. A common manifestation of bisexual erasure is a tendency for bisexuals to be referred to as heterosexual when they are intimately involved with people of the opposite sex and to be labeled as homosexual when they are involved with people of the same sex.

Bisexual erasure may stem from a belief that the bisexual community does not deserve equal status or inclusion within gay and lesbian communities. This can take the form of omitting the word bisexual in the name of an organization or event that serves the whole LGBT community, including it as "bi-sexual", implying there are only two authentic sexual orientations, or treating the subject of bisexuality in a derogatory way.

Historically, bisexual women have had their sexuality labeled by lesbian feminist circles as an "apolitical cop-out". Bisexual women have been seen as "not radical enough" because of their attraction to cisgender men. Rodriguez asserts bisexuality was regarded as anti-feminist by many lesbians because of the implied "desires for penetration, sexual dominance, and submission", and similar lines of thinking about bisexual women continue to result in exclusion and erasure in the present day.

In 2013, a study published in the Journal of Bisexuality surveyed thirty people who identified as part of the lesbian, gay, queer or bisexual communities and their individual experiences with coming out. Ten of these people reported they claimed the label of bisexuality first, and later came out again as lesbian, gay, or queer. The theory that emerged in this study introduced the concept of the "queer apologetic", in which one attempts to reconcile their same-gender attraction with the social norm of heterosexuality.

Bisexuals have been overlooked in the same-sex marriage debate: Where same-sex marriage is illegal, those campaigning for it have failed to highlight the inconsistencies of marriage laws concerning bisexuals, whose right to marry depends solely on the gender of their partner. Secondly, when same-sex marriage is available, a bisexual partner will generally be referred to as lesbian or gay. For example, one of the first people to take part in a same-sex marriage in the United States, Robyn Ochs, was widely referred to in the media as a lesbian, despite identifying herself in interviews as bisexual.

For many years, the Lambda Literary Awards did not have a category for bisexual literary works, which was finally established in 2006 after lobbying by BiNet USA. Although some bisexuality-related works, such as the anthology Bi Any Other Name: Bisexual People Speak Out, were nominated for the awards before the creation of bisexual categories, they competed in gay or lesbian categories. For instance, June Jordan, who self-identified as bisexual in her writing, was posthumously given a Lambda Award for lesbian poetry.

=== Historical examples of erasure ===
Modern biographers of Lord Byron, a Romantic poet and volunteer for the Greek War of Independence, generally agree that he was bisexual. This aspect of him was, however, long suppressed by his publishing firm John Murray. In May 1824, one month after Byron's death, the publisher burned his memoirs to conceal evidence of his bisexuality, and continued to deny it into the 1950s.

Helena Molony, an Irish feminist and a participant in the 1916 Easter Uprising, is considered to have been bisexual. Although she had relationships with men throughout her life, from the 1930s until her death in 1967, she was in a relationship with a woman named Evelyn O'Brien. Marie Mulholland, author of the book The Politics and Relationships of Kathleen Lynn, said that after O'Brien died, "her family ensured that all [of] her personal papers were destroyed, which is always an indication that something is being hidden."

== In academia ==
=== Theoretical frameworks ===
Alternative approaches to the concept of bisexuality have been developed that expand the definition of sexual identity outward from a "this or that" mentality to a "this and that" mentality. Jenée Wilde presents the idea of what she calls "dimensional sexuality" in an article for Sexual and Relationship Therapy, a theoretical framework in which gender is not the primary factor in sexual attraction, rather it is one of many axes. These other axes of attraction can include the desire for either monogamy or polyamory, and the fluidity of desire for the various gender(s) in a partner over time. Wilde uses her framework to broaden the scale of sexual identity from a simple binary spectrum from "mono-sexual" to "bisexual", and to establish relationships between these identities; these relationships would not alienate individuals without a single "fixed object" of attraction.

Viewpoints like Wilde's have been applied by scholars such as Laura Erickson-Schroth and Jennifer Mitchell to pieces of pop-culture and literature; Steven Angelides also produced a book on the place of bisexuality in research and societal awareness throughout history, using a similar framework. Both pieces aim to achieve more inclusive readings of sexuality and allow for the re-designation of literary figures and real people as bisexual, rather than continuing with the assumption that any same-gender activity, explicit or implied, is homosexual, and any opposite-gender activity heterosexual.

An example of a viewpoint similar to Wilde's is D.S. Neff's reading of Lord Byron's Childe Harold's Pilgrimage, which finds the poem is ambiguous in its mentioning of "concubines and carnal companie" as well as later parts of the work; Neff finds these ambiguities to be implications that both male and female lovers were had by the protagonist. This bisexual portrayal is supported through Byron's real-world interactions with lovers of multiple genders, and the culture of his literary affiliates at Cambridge condoning those interactions in the midst of the 19th century's moral panic around same-gender desires.

Erickson-Schroth and Mitchell's 2009 article in the Journal of Bisexuality performs a similar analysis of Written on the Body by Jeanette Winterson and Well of Loneliness by Radclyffe Hall; the assertion behind these scholars' work is the bisexual experience has existed throughout the history of humanity, and while it has only recently been acknowledged even in queer and LGBT circles, it is in no way an exclusively modern phenomenon.

There are also interpretations of literature that focus on the symbolic expressions of bisexuality rather than its explicit mention. Linda K. Hughes' analysis of Alexander Smith's A Life-Drama contends the atypical nature of the heterosexual courtship in the poem stands in place of the romance between the main character's "intimate friendship" with another man. Other analyses use the subtextual practices and common allusions of the Victorian period/19th century that referenced bisexuality or homosexuality to show the presence of bisexual themes in Bram Stoker's Dracula and Henry James' The Turn of the Screw.

=== In academic literature ===
Bisexual individuals have largely been overlooked in academic literature. Hemmings posits that bisexual erasure is essential in queer studies to keep lesbians and gay men as the main subjects of study. Bisexuals are often included under the umbrella of LGBT+ in academic studies. However, data specific to bisexuals is lacking. Historically, academics began to study bisexuals in relation to HIV and AIDS. These studies contributed to the mythology that bisexuals have a higher chance of transmitting HIV and AIDS.

=== In schools ===
More schools teach about heterosexuality and homosexuality, not solely heterosexuality. Support for gay and lesbian people has come to public schools in the form of the gay–straight alliances (GSAs). According to John Elia, this can cause harm to students who do not identify with either of those sexualities. However, some schools have adapted this acronym to include other LGBTQ+ groups. For instance, West Ranch High School has the "gender-sexuality association" on their club list for the 2020–2021 school year. Melissa Smith and Elizabethe Payne state there are several instances where faculty have been silent when it comes to bullying of LGBTQ students.

=== Psychological ===
Kirby (2020) conducted a recent study examining definitions of both explicit and implicit biases that go along with the topic of bisexual erasure. Kirby's study found that there is a gap between what people say what they believe versus their automatic responses and reactions in terms of bisexuality. Therefore, even though people who think and say that they are accepting towards bisexuality can still have a unconscious bias. This bias affects how bisexual people. deal with invalidation in their everyday lives as this unconscious can shape how society sees them.

Liam Cahill wrote an article, "Tackling Bisexual Erasure: An Explosive Comparison of Bisexual, Gay, and Straight Cisgender Men's Body Image", he analyzed how bisexual erasure affects men's body image and self perception. Cahill described how bisexual men face pressures put on them which are tied to masculinity and attractiveness. These ideas are shaped by lack of representation and acceptance surrounding the idea of bisexual identities. (Cahill 2024).

Altogether, both Kirby and Cahill's studies describe how bisexual erasure can impact mental health.

== Media depictions ==
=== General ===
Some media outlets have portrayed bisexual behaviors in ancient and non-Western cultures, such as ancient Greek pederasty or Native American Two-Spirits, as proof that homosexuality has been widely accepted in other times and cultures, even though it can also be seen as proof of the existence and acceptance of bisexuality.

In both the gay and mainstream media, individuals who have kept their sexual identity unknown have been portrayed as either gay (if male) or straight (if women) when they engaged in romantic or sexual relationships with both men and women. The same has occurred even with people who have openly identify themselves as bisexual. Ani DiFranco's 1998 marriage to Andrew Gilchrist was portrayed in both gay and mainstream media as renouncing lesbianism, even though she had been out as bisexual since the very beginning of her career. Madonna has called herself bisexual in interviews and has frequently engaged in public acts of same-sex intimacy with other female celebrities, but is typically portrayed by media as a heterosexual woman who dabbles in lesbian imagery for pure shock value, with any possibility she might be genuinely bisexual being discounted entirely. Lady Gaga is sometimes labeled as either "gay" or "straight" in the media even though she has publicly identified as bisexual. Freddie Mercury, who according to his obituary was a "self-confessed bisexual", is often depicted as gay by the mainstream media.

The media in both communities also often refers to the "gay and lesbian" community, ignoring bisexual and/or transgender people. There have also been examples of media outlets referring to "lesbian, gay and transgender" issues while still excluding or ignoring bisexuals.

Bisexual women specifically are subject to both hyper-visibility and erasure. Bisexual women are over-represented in pornography, reality television, and music videos as part of the male gaze. However, representations of bisexual women as agents in their sexuality are lacking. The erasure of sexual agency for bisexual women of color is prevalent within the media as well. Bisexuality stereotypically implies a sense of uncontrolled sexual desire; this is then intensified for women of color who are already hypersexualized.

In 2013, British Olympian diver Tom Daley came out as bisexual. Several media sources supported his decision to tell the world about his sexuality, but they labeled him as "gay" instead of bisexual.

On August 5, 2020, Paper Magazine published an interview with ND Stevenson and Rebecca Sugar, to bring them in conversation with each other. Sugar noted the recent increase of "LGBTQIA content in animated and children's media", with very little LGBTQ+ content over the history of animation, and called those who claim there are enough lesbians in animation to be completely wrong and a form of bisexual erasure. Later, Sugar pointed to the bisexual erasure in the Steven Universe fandom around 2015.

=== Television ===
On December 30, 2009, MTV premiered their 23rd season of the show The Real World, featuring two bisexual participants, Emily Schromm and Mike Manning. Although Manning himself identifies as bisexual, many bloggers and commenters on blogs claimed he was gay. Furthermore, while a behind-the-scenes MTV Aftershow and subsequent interview revealed that both Manning and Schromm had had encounters with both men and women while on the show, the show was edited to make it seem as though they had only been with men. In 2016, popular sitcom The Good Place aired on NBC starring Kristen Bell as bisexual Eleanor Shellstrop. However, many were disappointed in the show's portrayal of Eleanor's sexuality as a joke which was never taken any further than occasional passing comments about her attractions to women, and therefore devaluing the validity of bisexuality on the television screen.

In Game of Thrones, Oberyn Martell is a character who is presented as bisexual. However, the character's bisexuality is not a facet of his identity. Rather, it is used as a way of characterizing him as someone who is greedy. Pedro Pascal, who plays Oberyn, claims that his character "does not discriminate in his pleasures...to limit yourself in terms of experience doesn't make any sense to him." Thus, his bisexuality is erased and replaced with the stereotype that bisexual people are overly promiscuous.

Frank Underwood from House of Cards is similarly characterized. His philosophy is that "sex is power." He has sex with both men and women for the purpose of controlling them, using bisexuality as a ploy rather than an expression of identity.

In ABC's Grey's Anatomy, Callie Torres went through many relationships spanning her eleven seasons with both men and women. Callie faced moments of both prejudice and confusion from others and within herself, especially when her mother disapproved of her marriage to Arizona Robbins. Callie continued to focus on affirming what she knew to be true about herself and challenged the "bi-erasure" stereotype by affirming her consistently disproving the narrative that bisexuality is when someone is "one the road" to be gay. Her journey speaks to the struggle for acceptance and identity that many LGBTQ+ people face. Her understanding of relationships was forced to expand when she and Mark Sloan conceived a baby together while she and Arizona were broken up. This led to a three-person co-parenting style and accusations like this is Callie's "Bi-dream come true" because she has both a man and woman in her life.

== In law ==
=== United States ===
Individuals identifying as bisexual have been absent from conversations surrounding LGBT-rights and litigation. Examples include the early use of the term "gay marriage" as opposed to "same-sex marriage" or "marriage equality", as well as the lack of recognition of bisexuality in briefs or opinions handed down by the courts. A survey of relevant terminology in LGBT-rights cases found, excluding a brief period in U.S. Supreme Court history when bisexuals were mentioned alongside gays and lesbians, bisexuality has not been mentioned in Supreme Court opinions or briefs in major LGBT rights cases, which often describe gays and lesbians as being exclusively affected by sexual orientation discrimination.

Bisexual erasure also appears in law and policy in the U.S. Nancy Marcus (2018) analyzed how bisexuality is often left out of legal discourse, even within LGBTQ+ rights cases. Nancy's research found that bisexuality is often left out of legal frameworks, even LGBTQ+ rights cases. Her work points out how many rulings treat sexual orientation as a binary model of either gay or straight, leaving bisexual people largely invisible in the legal system.

Nancy Marcus wrote another article that describes bisexual erasure in political movements (Marcus 2018, Bi.org) describing how bisexual activists and issues have historically been overlooked in favor of narratives solely focused on gay and lesbian experiences.

While courts have begun to increasingly use the term same-sex in litigation involving sexual minority groups, this term is still used interchangeably with gay, lesbian, and homosexual, therefore erasing the bisexual contingent. Nancy Marcus uses the monumental Obergefell v. Hodges case that grants same-sex marriage rights as an example of nearly complete bisexuality erasure despite efforts, including an amicus brief to the Supreme Court and outreach to the plaintiffs' legal team, by legal organizations such as BiLaw. This is important in the U.S. legal system when the law is developed through case law, since failing to mention bisexual identities in legal decisions implies a "secondary" status of bisexuals within the LGBT community, with the judiciary appearing to give the imprimatur to the relegation of bisexuality to a lesser, or completely ignored, status.

Marcus states that misunderstanding and erasure of bisexuality within the US legal system results in tangible harm to bisexual litigants, including the increased likelihood of losing parental rights and the probability of being denied asylum from anti-LGBT countries. Custody issues arise due to the belief that bisexual people are too unstable to be parents, while bisexuals seeking asylum from countries hostile to LGBT individuals are viewed with suspicion, including not being "gay enough". This is due to a common assumption within the legal community a person can only be legitimately attracted to one gender; therefore, a bisexual asylum-seeker is more likely to be considered a fraud.

=== Canada ===
In legal protection documents, such as the Canadian Human Rights Act, bisexual people are equally protected from discrimination as gay, lesbian, and transgender people are, but the term "bisexual" is not mentioned explicitly. A study of the labor market conducted in Canada in 2019 found that bisexual men and women do not fare as well as their peers in the workplace. Sean Waite, John Ecker, and Lori E. Ross discovered that "bisexual men earned less than both heterosexual and gay men," and "bisexual women were at the bottom of the gender and sexual orientation wage hierarchy." In the article it is also admitted that research on bisexual individuals is limited because of erasure in the census. The census does not allow an option for bisexuals, and thus they are reduced to heterosexual or homosexual depending on the sex of their partner.

=== Europe ===
Much of the existing research on bisexual erasure is centered around the United States, recent research has expanded in order to include international perspectives. One global perspective was written in Europe where Wurthmann and Ortega wrote an article, "Bisexual Erasure and Homophobia: Attitudinal Patterns under Consideration of Sexual Identity". Wurthmann and Ortega examined attitudes across European countries and stated that bisexual erasure is not limited to one region but reflects a wider cultural and political attitudes towards bisexuality (Wurthmann and Ortega 2024).

== Mental health and imposter syndrome ==
=== Imposter syndrome ===
As of 2021, bisexual individuals make up 56.8% of the LGBTQ+ community. Though bisexual people make up over 50 percent of the LGBTQ+ community, it is very common for these individuals to feel invisible or that they do not belong. This idea can take form in feeling that they are just "confused" or "have not figured it out yet", a form of imposter syndrome. Imposter syndrome is defined as feeling like a fraud or not feeling a sense of belonging. There are a multitude of factors that contribute to these feelings for bisexual people. Though it can differ from person to person, research shows that the two most common reasons for these feelings are biphobia and bisexual erasure or invisibility. Biphobia is the backlash toward bisexual individuals from media and within the LGBTQ+ community, for example negative stereotypes of the bisexual individuals being hypersexual and unfaithful. Bisexual invisibility or erasure is the idea of ignoring, or removing the evidence of bisexuality. These biases combine with interpersonal and legal discrimination to create negative outcomes that are specific to the bisexual community. Commonly, this occurs through denying that bisexuality is a real sexual orientation, being LGBTQ+ inclusive but not offering bi-specific resources, mislabeling bisexual individuals as gay/lesbian, and more. Bisexual people face biases on many fronts: from the media, friends, family, service providers, employers, heterosexual people, but most commonly from people who identify with the LGBTQ+ community. One example of this is when a bisexual youth show higher incidents of risk and risky behavior due to the discrimination they face from family and friends.

Within the bisexual community, it is found that bisexual women are more likely to and feel safer to come out as bisexual than men, 33% vs. 12%. Across the LGBTQ+ population, it is perceived that bisexual women and lesbians are more accepted by society than gay men, bisexual men or transgender people. Within the bisexual community, perceived acceptance is 33% for women, about 8% for men and 3% for those who are transgender and non-binary. Additionally, queer imposter syndrome can be largely influenced by the media and community. Research suggests that bisexual individuals have more mental health challenges than cisgender, heterosexual, lesbian, and gay individuals.

It has been suggested that there are four ways to help reduce and eventually eliminate the imposter syndrome:

1. Skepticism
2. Humility
3. Grounding
4. Self-Compassion

== See also ==
- Bialogue
- Allonormativity
- Amatonormativity
- Bisexual politics
- Denialism
- Discrimination against asexual people (aphobia)
- Heteronormativity
- Heterosexism
- Homonegativity
- Homophobia
- Lesbian erasure
- Political lesbianism
- Social invisibility
