= Bi Academic Intervention =

1993–1997 UK bisexual academic group

Bi Academic Intervention was a group of bisexual academics, researchers, scholars and writers active in the UK from 1993 to 1997. The group provided a forum for discussing bisexual theory.

== History ==
Bi Academic Intervention, a group of bisexual academics, researchers and writers, was formed at the 11th National Bisexual Conference held at the University of Nottingham in October 1993. The group aimed to create discussion around bisexual theory, provide visibility for bisexual researchers, and to ensure that bisexual identity was represented in academic research and discussions about sexuality. The group ran a number of one day events between 1993 and 1995 and, between 1993 and 1997, ran biannual day schools on bisexuality. Bi Academic Intervention published a newsletter that enabled bisexual academics and researchers to develop and share their theories. The group disbanded in 1995 as it was not felt to be productive to continue discussing bisexual theory in isolation from the related domains of feminist and queer theory.

== Publications ==
An editorial collective of the same name was formed by members of the original Bi Academic Intervention and published a volume of bisexual theory The Bisexual Imaginary: Representation, Identity, and Desire in 1997. In the same year, the group also published a special issue of the International Journal of Sexuality and Gender Studies focused on bisexual theory.

== Goals ==
The group articulated their goals in their co-written introduction to The Bisexual Imaginary:

in so far as Bi Academic Intervention is an intervention, one of whose goals is to carve a space for bisexual theory, we want to produce work which will impact upon and redirect an existing and important field. Second, it is important because of debates about bisexual invisibility. There is an ongoing concern within bisexual communities to make bisexuality visible in places where it has previously been marginalized, and the strategies and pitfalls of representation occupy a key place in this concern. But third, another goal of Bi Academic Intervention is to intervene within bisexual communities. We are uncomfortable with the assertion that bisexual visibility has been a constant absence, and it therefore now an unproblematic good, and want to ask: what are the different effects of images of bisexuality, and the different meanings that become invested in it?
