= Journal of Sexual & Marital Therapy =

The term Journal of Sexual & Marital Therapy (or Journal of Sexual and Marital Therapy) is a common misidentification of one of the following scholarly journals, which have similar titles:

- Journal of Sex & Marital Therapy
- Sexual and Marital Therapy (now Sexual and Relationship Therapy)
