= The Fear of Child Sexuality =

2019 book

- Cover of the 2019 University of Chicago Press edition
- Author: Steven Angelides
- Language: English
- Publisher: University of Chicago Press
- Publication date: 2019
- Publication place: USA
- Pages: 272
- ISBN: 978-0226648637

The Fear of Child Sexuality: Young People, Sex and Agency is a book by Steven Angelides. It examines the history of moral panics regarding children and sex in Australia.
