= Angry Cognitions Scale =

Psychometric measure of anger

The Angry Cognitions Scale (ACS) is a psychometric measure of how anger is acted out. It measures cognitive processes and their relation to attributes of anger, including misattributing causation, overgeneralizing, catastrophizing, demandingness, inflammatory labeling, and adaptive processes. The ACS is similar to, but distinct from, the Anger Rumination Scale (ARS). The ARS characterises the tendency of an individual to focus on anger episodes, but does not measure cognitive processes generally associated with anger.

The Angry Cognitions Scale was developed to enhance the effectiveness of cognitive-behavioral therapy on anger. The ACS was initially used to analyze potentially hostile relationships, but it can now identify depression, anxiety, and other anger-related cognitive functions. This scale has received generally positive reviews. Researchers have concluded that the ACS is a valid source to measure anger and anger-related expressions and cognitions. The scale has also successfully been able to predict anger in daily experiences. One application where the ACS has had success is in anger management treatments and interventions.

The Angry Cognitions Scale (ACS) helps measure specific thought patterns related to anger, making it easier to separate anger-related thinking from general negative moods. People who score high on subscales like inflammatory labeling or overgeneralizing often report experiencing more frequent anger and lack of emotional control in daily life. Because of this, clinicians often use the scale to pinpoint exact cognitive triggers when planning cognitive-behavioral therapy.

== See also ==
- Personality test
