= Shiri Eisner =

Mizrahi and bisexual writer and activist

- שירי אייזנר
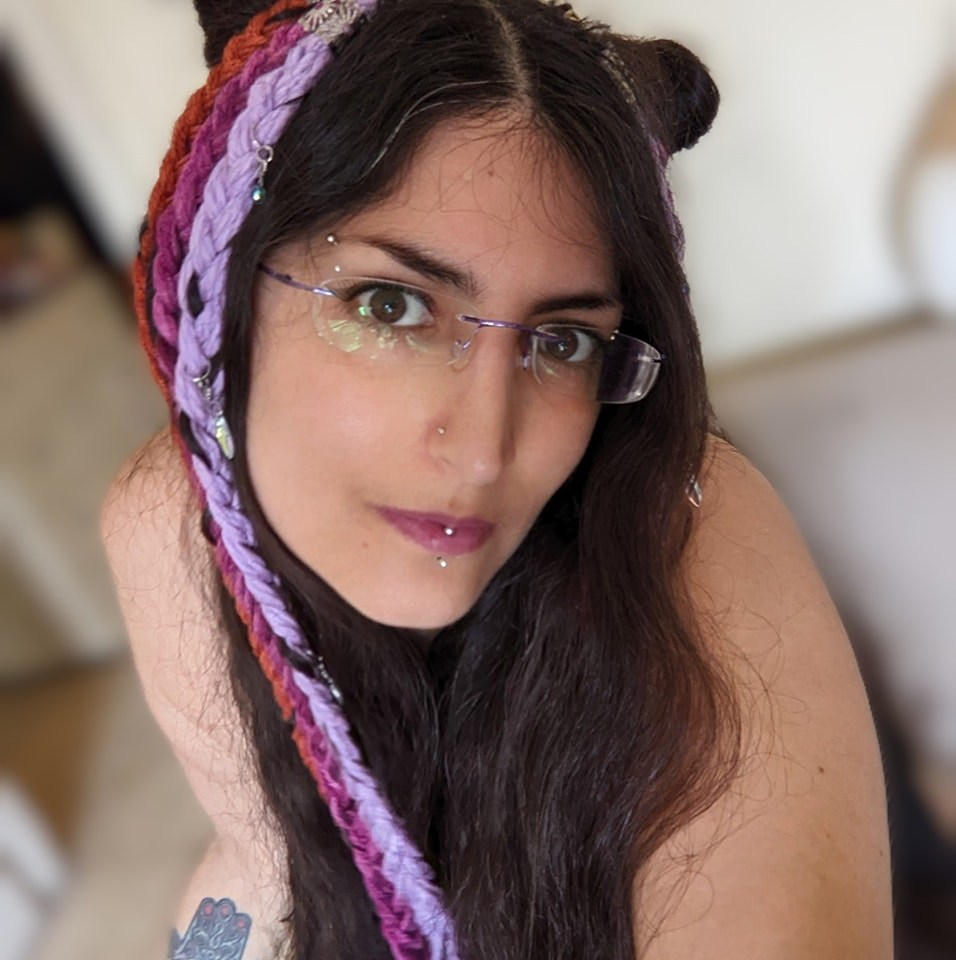
- Born: 1983 (age 42–43)
- Occupations: Writer, activist
- Notable work: Bi: Notes for a Bisexual Revolution

Shiri Eisner (Hebrew: שירי אייזנר) is a Lambda-nominated genderqueer bisexual Israeli writer and activist based in Tel Aviv.

Eisner argues that the subversive power of stereotypes attached to bisexuality should be utilized rather than rejected by bisexual movements. They have identified with anarchism, veganism, and feminism.

== Bi: Notes for a Bisexual Revolution ==
Eisner's book, Bi: Notes for a Bisexual Revolution, was published in 2013.

In it, Eisner explores intersectional bisexual politics and the radical potential of bisexuality. They write about monosexual privilege, the harms it can cause in society, and the intersection of racialized, disabled, and transgender people and bisexuality.

The book was nominated in 2014 for a Lambda Literary Award in the Bisexual Nonfiction category.

== Personal life ==
Their mother is of Iraqi-Jewish heritage and their father is of German-Jewish heritage, though their mother's culture was more dominant in their upbringing. Eisner is genderqueer and uses she/her and they/them pronouns.

They studied at Tel Aviv University. They founded Panorama—Bi and Pansexual Feminist Community, the second-ever bisexual/pansexual organization in Israel.

Eisner is an atheist, anarchist, and vegan. They are outspoken in their criticism of the Israeli occupation of Palestine and the Israeli far right.

== Partial bibliography ==
- Eisner, Shiri (2012). "Love, Rage and the Occupation: Bisexual Politics in Israel/Palestine". Journal of Bisexuality. Vol. 12, no. 1. Routledge. pp. 80–137. ISSN 1529-9716. OCLC 4839599367.
- Eisner, Shiri (2013). Bi: notes for a bisexual revolution. Berkeley, California: Seal Press. ISBN 9781580054751. OCLC 849928858.
- Eisner, Shiri (2016). "Monosexism". The SAGE Encyclopedia of LGBTQ Studies. Edited by Abbie E. Goldberg, SAGE.
- Eisner, Shiri (2020). "Queer Vegan Politics and Consistent Anti-Oppression". Queer and Trans Voices: Achieving Liberation Through Consistent Anti-Oppression. Edited by Julia Feliz Brueck and Zoie Zane McNeill, Sanctuary Publishers.

== See also ==
- Bisexual theory
- Anarchism in Israel
