= Linda K. Hughes =

Linda K. Hughes is the Addie Levy Professor of Literature at the Texas Christian University. She is a noted scholar researching women's literature, British literature and issues around gender and sexuality.

== Selected publications ==
- Hughes, L. K., & Lund, M. (1999). Victorian Publishing and Mrs. Gaskell's Work. University of Virginia Press.
- Hughes, L. K. (2010). The Cambridge introduction to Victorian poetry. Cambridge University Press.
- Hughes, L. K. (2005). Graham R.: Rosamund Marriott Watson, Woman of Letters. Ohio University Press.
