= Power position =

Power position is a concept from Feng Shui, the ancient Chinese practice of studying one's position within one's surroundings.

In Feng Shui, the Power Position or "Dragon Seat" is the physical position in the room for a business meeting, which supposedly has the most power. The person in this position can see all entrances to the room, and is seated against a wall or other structure, so that no activity occurs behind the person. This makes this person the focus of attention to everyone else in the room.

People who believe this idea believe that the individual in the power position has a significant advantage in negotiations and other types of business meetings.
