= Sexual and Relationship Therapy =

Peer-reviewed scholarly journal

- Discipline: Sexology
- Language: English

Publication details
- Publisher: Routledge (Taylor & Francis) (U.K.)
- Frequency: Quarterly

Standard abbreviations
- ISO 4: Sex. Relatsh. Ther.

Indexing
- ISSN: 1468-1994 (print); 1468-1749 (web)
- OCLC no.: 45007351

Sexual and Relationship Therapy is a peer-reviewed, scholarly journal offering a multidisciplinary forum for review and debate in the field of sex and relationship therapies. The journal presents original research and best practice and is a vehicle for new theory, methodology, and application. The focus of the journal is international and interdisciplinary in nature, with a range of contributions from diverse places on the globe, and myriad disciplines like sex therapy, sexual medicine, psychology, sexology, family therapy, public health, sociology, counselling, and medical ethics. It is the official journal of the College of Sexual and Relationship Therapists (COSRT). The journal was established in 1986 under the title Sexual and Marital Therapy, and under its current title since 2000. The editor-in-chief is Dr. Markie Twist (Antioch University New England).

== Abstracting and indexing ==
Sexual and Relationship Therapy is included in the Clarivate Analytics Social Sciences Citation Index. Its first Impact Factor was published in 2012. The 2020 Impact Factor is 1.283 (2020 Clarivate Analytics, Journal Citation Reports). The journal is also abstracted and indexed in ASSIA: Applied Social Sciences Index and Abstracts, Canadian Journal of Human Sexuality's 'Sex Research Update', Cumulative Index to Nursing and Allied Health Literature (CINAHL), Educational Research Abstracts online (ERA), EMBASE/Excerpta Medica, Family Index Database, Family and Society Studies Worldwide Database (FSSW), Family Studies Database (NISC), Psychological Abstracts/PsycINFO/PsychLIT, Scopus, Sexual Diversity Studies Database (SDS), Social Sciences Index, Sociological Abstracts, Special Education Needs Abstracts, Studies on Women and Gender Abstracts, Violence & Abuse Abstracts, and Sage Family Studies Abstracts.
