= Sitting on the fence =

Idiom

"Sitting on the fence" is a common idiom used in English to describe a person's lack of decisiveness, their neutrality or hesitance to choose between two sides in an argument or a competition, or inability to decide due to lack of courage. This is done either in order to remain on good terms with both sides, or due to apathy regarding the situation and not wanting to choose a position with which one does not actually agree. As a result, someone who "sits on the fence" will maintain a neutral and non-committal view regarding any of the other parties involved.

== Uses ==
=== In politics ===
Linguist John Russell Bartlett's 1848 Dictionary of Americanisms states:

In politics, to be on the fence, is to be neutral, or to be ready to join the strongest party, whenever it can be ascertained which is so. A man sitting on the top of a fence, can jump down on either side with equal facility. So with a politician who is on the fence; selfish motives govern him, and he is prepared at any moment to declare for either party.

The dictionary also includes the terms fence-man, defined as "a politician who is 'on the fence'" and fence-riding, the practice of "'sitting on the fence,' or remaining neutral in a political contest until it can be seen 'which way the cat is going to jump.'"

One literary example is found in James Russell Lowell's The Biglow Papers (1848):

When every fool knows that a man represents

Not the fellows that sent him, but them on the fence,

Impartially ready to jump either side,

And make the first use of a turn of the tide.

== See also ==
- Ambivalence
- Cold feet
