= Bisexual politics =

Political topic around sexuality

Bisexual politics are arguments surrounding individuals who identify as bisexual and their perspectives on issues involving sexuality, equality, visibility and inclusion. Some authors describe "bisexual politics" as a form of identity politics. One form of activism within bisexual politics includes the addition of the word bisexual onto lesbian and gay organisations (such as the acronym LGBT) and fighting employment discrimination for bisexual individuals.

== Academic arguments ==
New York University School of Law professor Kenji Yoshino says:

Gays de-legitimatize bisexuals ... the lesbian and gay community abounds with negative images of bisexuals as fence-sitters, traitors, cop-outs, closet cases, people whose primary goal in life is to retain 'heterosexual privilege'.

There is an underlying fear that including bisexuals as members in gay rights movements may hurt the movement, either because it is believed that bisexuals "enjoy heterosexual privilege", that they had less to lose than lesbian women or gay men, or because their presence lessens the solidarity among gay and lesbian groups in some way. Rather than fence sitters, bisexuals are at further risk for marginalization because they can be ostracized by both straight and gay communities. Writers on bisexuality recognize this danger, however. As sociologist Amanda Udis-Kessler, puts it, "We are not fence-sitters. Let us strive to be bridge-builders". These concerns are recognized by Lisa Orlando, author of Loving whom we choose, who writes:

We challenge many people's personal sense of what constitutes sexual identity. Whether we threaten by introducing a third category or by undermining the notion of categories altogether, we cause enough discomfort that many people deny our existence.

Thus, bisexual politics involve, among other issues, the debate over inclusion in both gay and straight movements and cultures.

== Issues ==
=== Identity ===
The problem of identity centers upon whether bisexuals build an identity around their bisexuality, what being a bisexual means socially, and how it relates to other identities such as feminism. One debate is whether or not it is valuable to establish bisexuality as a sexual identity. As author Jennifer Baumgardner writes:

It is feminist to understand bisexuality as its own identity too, because it's a chapter of women's history that has been repressed and misunderstood, and one that has contributed substantially to current ideas about queerness

However, the author recognizes that there are also political limitations to identifying as bisexual, saying that:

The thing about being bisexual is that you don't really have to be out in the same ways. You can often pass for straight. This can be a weak position politically – how can we organize people around gay rights if we don't identify, and can't be identified by others, as gay?

Out of this debate, a variety of identity terms have expanded to include the many ideas surrounding this complex issue of identity and sexuality including, pansexuality, omnisexuality, polysexuality, and just "being sexual".

=== Entitlement ===
Among some critics, a belief is held that bisexual politics is important to equal rights on the basis of entitlement. The term entitlement here refers specifically to the belief that a bisexual can be and are viewed as straight in some public spheres and thus enjoy the benefits of equality that come along with "assumed heterosexuality." Baumgardner recognizes this view and writes:

Bisexuality [...] contains the liberating potential of aligning with a disparaged (gay and lesbian) group but not being relegated – at least not full-time – to the ghetto. This is the political value of what is called, negatively, entitlement. The political weakness of entitlement (lack of consciousness) have been overstated – as with young feminists – and its potential for change has been neglected [...] Perhaps we need those bridging people on the side of privilege willing to connect the gay and straight worlds- in order to get more done [...] It takes someone who has known relative freedom, who expects it and loves it, to help ignite social change

=== Visibility ===
Bisexual politics also involves the arguments surrounding how visible a minority of bisexuals are in society, and how this interacts bisexual activism. It has been said that bisexuals can identify between groups at different times. For example, the question, "When a female bisexual is in a relationship with a man does she cease to become bisexual and alternatively heterosexual?" and also, "When the bisexual female abandons her male partner for a female one, can that individual identify as homosexual?" This belief can lead to issues of visibility, in that a bisexual person may identify with either sexual orientation, or with neither. Another aspect of this debate is whether bisexuals should operate as visible minorities distinct from homosexuals. As Lani Kaahumanu writes, "So, why does the attitude exist that there is no bisexual community, and why has it been used against us so effectively? Why have we 'accepted' invisibility, and why haven't we, up to this point, projected a more visible presence, creating a more prominent community that even the most virulent biphobes would have to recognize?"

=== Inclusion ===
Inclusion is a main issue with regard to bisexual politics as this group is at risk of being viewed as homosexual by heterosexual groups, and also as "traitors" or closeted by the gay and lesbian communities. Lesbian and gay organizations all over the country hotly debate whether or not to include bisexuals in programming and names of groups and events. Author Naomi Tucker argues:

Bisexuality can be a unifying force in the world. But we must avoid the mistakes of some of our lesbian sisters who profess sexual acceptance [...] [while they] invalidate bisexuality as an orientation [...] If we claim self-definition for ourselves, then we must accord that right to others [...] As a bisexual movement we can create a community where it is safe for everyone to comfortably express their sexuality. As well, a quote from collection of bisexual testimonials puts the issue poignantly "I very much resented the smugness of lesbians who said my evolution was incomplete [...] Although I understand sexual politics, I could no sooner change my sexual orientation, nor would I want to, any more than a lesbian could.

Inclusion continues to be an issue in bisexual politics, and specifically whether bisexuals represent an additional minority or rather a merging of opposing heterosexual and homosexual groups. Thus bisexual politics considers how bisexuals may offer a bridge by which individuals can reconcile differences and be a positive force in human rights.

There has been much debate over how to include bisexuality into LGBT communities. Much of this involves the invisibility of the bisexual community. Many people do not fully understand bisexuality. Many members of the bisexual community tend to gravitate more toward either the heterosexual or gay communities. This has led to difficulty in creating visibility for bisexuality because western culture has created a binary of heterosexual or gay, with very few people choosing to live in both communities.
