= Steven Angelides =

Steven Angelides is a historian, author and academic at La Trobe University. He also serves as honorary senior research fellow at Macquarie University. He is the author of A History of Bisexuality (2001) and The Fear of Child Sexuality (2019).

== Career ==
Angelides published A History of Bisexuality in 2001. The book studies the ways that bisexuality has been represented throughout the modern period of Western civilization, particularly through the lenses of psychoanalysis and queer theory.

In 2019, he published The Fear of Child Sexuality: Young People, Sex, and Agency under the University of Chicago Press. The book uses case studies of sex scandals in the United States and Australia to examine how they shaped the concept of "innocence" and other common tropes associated with childhood.

Some of Angelides' works have been published by Nordic scientific journal Lambda Nordica.

== Reception ==
University of California researcher Jonathan Alexander and University of Puerto Rico academic Serena Anderlini-D'Onofrio wrote in their review of The History of Bisexuality that the book "offers a much-needed historical and theoretical intervention in our thinking about the history of what the modern era knows as sexuality".

University of Iowa professor Ellen Lewin said that Angelides' book on bisexuality "tells us a lot about the anxieties and uncertainties that afflict sexuality researchers, but relatively little about bisexuality itself".

University of London professor Joanna Bourke said in her book review that Fear of Child Sexuality was "particularly enlightening" due to its focus on the "dramatic shifts in the responses of adults to child sexuality over the 20th and 21st centuries". She also said that it was unfortunate how Angelides would recurrently use the term "child" in an ambiguous manner throughout the book, often to refer to White, middle-class male adolescents.

== Works ==
- Angelides, Steven. A History of Bisexuality. University of Chicago Press, 2001. pp. 296.
- Angelides, Steven. The Fear of Child Sexuality: Young People, Sex, and Agency. University of Chicago Press, 2019. pp. 234.
