= Bisexual Book Awards =

Annual literary award for bisexual fiction

The Bisexual Book Awards were an annual literary award program, presented by the Bi Writers Association to honour the year's best works of literature addressing themes of bisexuality. The awards were presented for the first time in 2013. Sheela Lambert founded and organized the awards until 2021.

The Awards have not occurred since 2021.

== History ==
Bisexual activists Sheela Lambert, Wendy Curry, and Amy Andre asked the long-running Lambda Literary Awards to include a category on bisexual literature but were rebuffed due to Lambda Literary's perception that there weren't enough bisexual books to support a category. The activists and others searched for bisexual books on the internet until they found enough to start the Lambda Literary Award for Bisexual Literature in 2006. Eventually the award grew to two, but in 2012 it again shrank to one category, and Lambert felt she had to add more options for authors of bisexual literature to be recognized. Previously, Mike Szymanski and other authors had asked Lambert to create an award for the bi+ community.

The first Bisexual Book Awards launched in 2013. The number of categories and books steadily grew in its first years, with 6 categories and 60 submissions in the second year, and 10 categories and 72 books in the third. Lambert organized the awards but recruited judges to help select winners.

Awards were presented in 11 categories, where any writer who addressed bisexual themes in their work could be submitted for consideration regardless of their own sexual orientation. Two special awards were also presented: the Bi Book Publisher Award to the publishing company that had submitted the most books to the awards program that year, and the Bi Writer Award for the best book by an out bisexual writer.

Book Riot criticized the 2018 Bisexual Book Awards for its unrepresentative slate of winners and ceremony invitees, who were overwhelmingly white.

Though winners for books published in 2021 were supposed to be announced on 28 January 2023, founder Sheela Lambert was hospitalized with COVID-19 and pneumonia two weeks prior and the awards were put on hold. In April 2024, the Bi Writers Association Facebook page announced that Lambert had died earlier in the year "due to complications from chronic illness"; while the post also expressed desire to award both the 2021 and 2022 awards, this has yet to occur.

== Honorees ==
=== Anthology ===
Award winners and finalists
Year	Author	Title	Publisher	Result	Ref.
2014	Robyn Ochs and H. Sharif Williams (eds.)	Recognize: The Voices of Bisexual Men (Note: In 2014, Recognize: The Voices of Bisexual Men won the Award for Anthology, Non-Fiction, and Writer of the Year.)	Bisexual Resource Center	Winner	
2014	Rachel Kramer Bussel (ed.)	Big Book of Submission: 69 Kinky Tales	Cleis Press	Finalist	
2016	Sasha L. Miller (eds.)	Enchanted Soles (Note: In 2016, Enchanted Soles was a finalist for the Award for Speculative Fiction and won the Award for Anthology.)	Less Than Three Press	Winner	
2016	Jon Macy and Tara Madison Avery (eds.)	ALPHABET: The LGBTQAIU Creators from Prism Comics (Note: In 2016, ALPHABET: The LGBTQAIU Creators from Prism Comics was a finalist for the Award for Anthology and Graphic Novel/Memoir.)	Stacked Deck Press	Finalist	

=== Biography and Memoir ===
Award winners and finalists
Year	Author	Title	Publisher	Result	Ref.
2013	Alden Jones	The Blind Masseuse: A Traveler’s Memoir from Costa Rica to Cambodia	Terrace Books/The University of Wisconsin Press	Winner	
2013	Charles "Zan" Christensen (ed.)	Anything That Loves: Comics Beyond Gay and Straight (Note: In 2013, Anything That Loves was a finalist for the Award for Biography and Memoir, and won the Award for Non-Fiction.)	Northwest Press	Finalist	
2013	Marina Peralta with Penelope James	Barriers to Love: Embracing a Bisexual Identity (Note: Barriers to Love: Embracing a Bisexual Identity was also...)	Barriers Press	Finalist	
2014	Daisy Hernández	A Cup of Water Under My Bed (Note: A Cup of Water Under My Bed won the Award for Biography and Memoir, and was a finalist for the Awards for Non-Fiction and Writer of the Year.)	Beacon Press	Winner	
2014	Alan Cumming	Not My Father's Son (Note: In 2014, Not My Father's Son was a finalist for the Award for Writer of the Read and Biography and Memoir.)	Dey Street Books / HarperCollins Publishers	Finalist	
2014	Allison Moon	Bad Dyke	Lunatic Ink	Finalist	
2014	Charles M. Blow	Fire Shut Up In My Bones (Note: In 2014, Fire Shut Up In My Bones was a finalist for the Award for Teen and Young Adult, Biography and Memoir, and Nonfiction.)	Houghton Mifflin Harcourt	Finalist	
2014	Daniel Schreiber	Susan Sontag: A Biography	Northwestern University Press	Finalist	
2014	Edward White	The Tastemaker: Carl Van Vechten and the Birth of Modern America (Note: In 2014, The Tastemaker was a finalist for the Awards for Biography and Memoir, and Non-fiction.)	Farrar, Straus and Giroux	Finalist	
2015	Kate Evans	Call It Wonder: An Odyssey of Love, Sex, Spirit, and Travel (Note: In 2015, Call It Wonder won the Awards for Biography and Memoir, and Writer of the Year.)	Coyote Creek Books	Winner	
2015	Chelsey Clammer	BodyHome	Hopewell Publications	Finalist	
2015	Emily Bingham	Irrepressible: The Jazz Age Life of Henrietta Bingham	Farrar, Straus and Giroux/Macmillan	Finalist	
2016	Juliet Nicolson	A House Full of Daughters	Farrar, Straus and Giroux / Macmillan	Winner	
2016	Ira Nadel	Virginia Woolf	London: Reaktion Books/ Chicago: Univ. of Chicago Press	Finalist	
2017	Monica Meneghetti	What the Mouth Wants: A Memoir of Food, Love and Belonging (Note: In 2017, What the Mouth Wants won the Award for Biography and Memoir and was a finalist for Writer of the Year.)	Dagger Editions/Caitlin Press	Winner	
2017	Peggy Seeger	First Time Ever (Note: In 2017, First Time Ever won the Awards for Biography and Memoir, and Writer of the Year.)	Faber & Faber	Winner	
2017	Miranda Pennington	A Girl Walks Into a Book	Seal Press/Hachette Book Group	Finalist	
2018	Sophie Lucido Johnson	Many Love (Note: In 2018, Many Love won the Awards for Biography and Memoir, and Non-Fiction.)	Touchstone / Simon & Schuster	Winner	
2018	Charlie Harmon	On the Road and Off the Record with Leonard Bernstein: My Years with the Exasperating Genius	Imagine Publishing/ Charlesbridge	Finalist	
2019	Carmen Maria Machado	In the Dream House	Graywolf Press	Winner	
2019	Jackson Bird	Sorted	Tiller Press / Simon & Schuster	Finalist	
2020	Molly Wizenberg	The Fixed Stars (Note: In 2020, The Fixed Stars won the Awards for Biography and Memoir, and Writer of the Year.)	Abrams Press	Winner	
2020	Celia Stahr	Frida in America (Note: In 2020, Frida in America was a finalist for the Awards for Biography and Memoir, and Writer of the Year.)	St. Martin's Press / Macmillan	Finalist	
2020	Raechel Anne Jolie	Rust Belt Femme	Belt Publishing	Finalist	
2021	Randa Jarrar	Love Is an Ex-Country	Catapult	Finalist	
2021	Luke Turner	Out of the Woods: Nature, Sexuality, and Faith in the Forest	Greystone Books	Finalist	
2021	Jen Winston	Greedy: Notes from a Bisexual Who Wants Too Much (Note: In 2021, Greedy was a finalist for the Awards for Biography and Memoir and Writer of the Year.)	Atria Books/Simon & Schuster	Finalist	

=== Erotica ===
Award winners and finalists
Year	Author	Title	Publisher	Result	Ref.
2012	Basil Papademos	Mount Royal, There's Nothing Harder than Love (Note: In 2012, Mount Royal won the Award for Erotica and was a finalist for the Awards for Fiction and Writer of the Year.)	Tightrope Books	Winner	
2012	Cecilia Tan	The Poet and the Prophecy (Note: In 2012, The Poet and the Prophecy was a finalist for the Awards for Erotica, Speculative Fiction, and Writer of the Year.)	Ravenous Romance	Finalist	
2012	Mykola Dementiuk	Times Square Queer: Tales of Bad Boys in the Big Apple (Note: In 2012, Times Square Queer was a finalist for the Awards for Erotica and Writer of the Year.)	Renaissance eBooks	Finalist	
2013	Adriana Kraft	The Reunion	B&B Publishing	Winner	
2013	Elizabeth Schechter	House of Sable Locks	Circlet Press	Finalist	
2013	Jean Roberta	The Flight of the Black Swan (Note: In 2013, The Flight of the Black Swan was a finalist for the Awards for Erotica and Writer of the Year.)	Lethe Press	Finalist	
2013	Livia Ellis	Memoirs of a Gigolo Omnibus, Vol. 1-4 (Note: In 2013, Memoirs of a Gigolo Omnibus, Vol. 1-4 was a finalist for the Awards for Erotica and Writer of the Year.)	Riverdale Avenue Books/ Desire	Finalist	
2013	Rachel Kramer Bussel (ed.)	Twice the Pleasure: Bisexual Women's Erotica (Note: In 2013, Twice the Pleasure was a finalist for the Award for Erotica and Writer of the Year.)	Cleis Press	Finalist	
2014	Julie Cox	Capricious: A Texan Tale of Love and Magic (Note: In 2014, Capricious won the Award for Erotica and was a finalist for the Award for Speculative Fiction.)	Circlet Press	Winner	
2014	Jaime Fessenden	Murder on the Mountain (Note: In 2014, Murder on the Mountain won the Award for Mystery and was a finalist for the Award for Erotica.)	Dreamspinner Press	Finalist	
2014	Livia Ellis	Memoirs of a Gigolo, Second Omnibus, Vol. 5-7 (Note: In 2014, Memoirs of a Gigolo, Second Omnibus, Vol. 5-7 was a finalist for the Awards for Erotica and Writer of the Year.)	Riverdale Avenue Books	Finalist	
2014	Megan Mulry	Bound to Be a Groom	Riptide Publishing	Finalist	
2014	Shari Slade and Amber Lin	One Kiss with a Rock Star (Note: In 2014, One Kiss with a Rock Star won the Award for Romance and was a finalist for the Award for Erotica.)	self-published	Finalist	
2015	Heidi Belleau and Sam Schooler	Dead Ringer	Riptide Publishing	Winner	
2015	Avon Gale	Let the Wrong Light In	Dreamspinner Press	Finalist	
2015	Lauren E. Mitchell	The Triad Trial	Less Than Three Press	Finalist	
2015	Lauren Gallagher	Kneel, Mr. President	Samhain Publishing	Finalist	
2015	Santino Hassell	Sunset Park	Dreamspinner Press	Finalist	
2015	Tess Bowery	She Whom I Love (Note: In 2015, She Whom I Love was a finalist for the Awards for Erotica and Romance.)	Samhain Publishing	Finalist	
2016	Lauren Gallagher	The Best Laid Plans (Note: In 2016, The Best Laid Plans won the Award for Erotica and was a finalist for the Award for Writer of the Year.)	Samhain Publishing	Winner	
2016	J A Rock	24/7	Riptide Publishing	Finalist	
2016	Nicole Wood	Club Trega	Riverdale Avenue Books	Finalist	
2016	Vanessa Clark	The Man on Top of the World	Bold Strokes Books	Finalist	
2017	TS Porter	Rescues and the Rhyssa (Note: In 2017, Rescues and the Rhyssa won the Award for Erotica and was a finalist for the Award for Speculative Fiction.)	Less Than Three Press	Winner	
2017	Leandra Vane	Cast from the Earth	Self-Published	Finalist	
2017	Stephanie Bull	The Shape of Veronica	Tau Press	Finalist	
2017	Tiffany Reisz	Michael's Wings	8th Circle Press	Finalist	
2018	Lexi Mohney	Carnal Knowledge: The Adoration of a Dangerous Woman and the Death of a Dream	Independently Published	Winner	
2018	M.K. Lee	Whatever Comes First	Less Than Three Press	Finalist	
2019	Lara Zielinsky	We Three: One and One and One Makes Three	Supposed Crimes	Winner	
2019	Elia Winters	Three for All	Cecaelia Press	Finalist	
2019	Rosalind Chase	Lot's Wife: An Erotic Retelling (Note: In 2019, Lot’s Wife won the Award for Writer of the Year and was a finalist for the Award for Erotica.)	Under Hill Press	Finalist	
2020 (Note: Not enough books were nominated to declare winners or finalists.)	Erin McLellan	Bottle Rocket	Independently Published	Honorable Mention	

=== Fiction ===
Award winners and finalists
Year	Author	Title	Publisher	Result	Ref.
2012	John Irving	In One Person	Simon & Schuster	Winner	
2012	Annette Lapointe	Whitetail Shooting Gallery (Note: In 2012, Whitetail Shooting Gallery was a finalist for the Awards for Fiction and Writer of the Year.)	Anvil Press Publishers	Finalist	
2012	Basil Papademos	Mount Royal, There's Nothing Harder than Love	Tightrope Books	Finalist	
2012	Brit Mandelo (ed.)	Beyond Binary: Genderqueer and Sexually Fluid Speculative Fiction (Note: In 2012, Beyond Binary won the Award for Speculative Fiction and was a finalist for the Awards for Fiction and Writer of the Year.)	Lethe Press	Finalist	
2012	Catherine Lundoff	Silver Moon (Note: In 2012, Silver Moon was a finalist for the Awards for Fiction, Speculative Fiction, and Writer of the Year.)	Lethe Press	Finalist	
2012	Ellis Avery	The Last Nude	Riverhead Books	Finalist	
2012	Richard Mason	History of a Pleasure Seeker	Random House / Knopf	Finalist	
2013	Manil Suri	The City of Devi	W. W. Norton & Company	Winner	
2013	Arlene Schindler	The Last Place She’d Look	ExtravaGonzo	Finalist	
2013	Bushra Rehman	Corona	Sibling Rivalry Press	Finalist	
2013	David Leavitt	The Two Hotel Francforts	Bloomsbury	Finalist	
2013	Frank Anthony Polito	The Spirit of Detroit	Woodward Avenue Books	Finalist	
2013	Nicola Griffith	Hild	Farrar, Straus and Giroux	Finalist	
2013	Susan Choi	My Education	Viking Adult	Finalist	
2014	Courtney Moreno	In Case of Emergency	McSweeney's Publishing	Winner	
2014	Emma Donoghue	Frog Music	Little, Brown/Little, Brown and Company	Finalist	
2014	Sarah Waters	The Paying Guests	Riverhead Books /Penguin Random House	Finalist	
2014	Sheela Lambert (ed.)	Best Bi Short Stories	Gressive Press/Circlet Press	Finalist	
2014	Vivek Shraya	She of the Mountains	Arsenal Pulp Press	Finalist	
2015	Lidia Yuknavitch	The Small Backs of Children	Harper Books/Harper Collins	Winner	
2015	Anna North	The Life and Death of Sophie Stark	Blue Rider Press/Penguin Random House	Finalist	
2015	Jennifer Steil	The Ambassador's Wife	Doubleday	Finalist	
2015	Kelly Gardiner	Goddess	Harper360/HarperCollins	Finalist	
2015	Redfern Jon Barrett	The Giddy Death of the Gays & the Strange Demise of Straights	Lethe Press	Finalist	
2016	Erin Judge	Vow of Celibacy (Note: In 2016, Vow of Celibacy won the Award for Fiction and was a finalist for the Award for Writer of the Year.)	Rare Bird Books	Winner	
2016	Georgia Clark	The Regulars	Emily Bestler Books/Atria/Simon & Schuster	Finalist	
2016	Susan Wittig Albert	Loving Eleanor	Persevero Press	Finalist	
2017	Carmen Maria Machado	Her Body and Other Parties (Note: In 2017, Her Body and Other Parties won the Award for Fiction and was a finalist for Writer of the Year.)	Graywolf Press	Winner	
2017	A. M. Leibowitz	Keeping the Faith	Supposed Crimes	Finalist	
2017	Amanda Kabak	The Mathematics of Change	Brain Mill Press	Finalist	
2017	André Aciman	Enigma Variations	Farrar, Straus and Giroux/Macmillan	Finalist	
2017	Karen Connelly	The Change Room (Note: In 2017, The Change Room was a finalist for the Award for Fiction and Writer of the Year.)	Random House / PenguinRandomHouse	Finalist	
2017	Sylvia Brownrigg	Pages for Her (Note: In 2017, Pages for Her was a finalist for the Award for Fiction and Writer of the Year.)	Counterpoint	Finalist	
2018	Elaine Castillo	America Is Not the Heart (Note: In 2018, America Is Not the Heart won the Award for Fiction and Writer of the Year.)	Viking / Penguin Random House	Winner	
2018	Alan Robert Clark	The Prince of Mirrors	Fairlight Books	Finalist	
2018	Elizabeth J. Colen and Carol Guess	True Ash	Black Lawrence Press	Finalist	
2018	Emily Strelow	The Wild Birds	A Barnacle Book / Rare Bird Books	Finalist	
2018	Jennifer Natalya Fink	Bhopal Dance	FC2/University of Alabama Press	Finalist	
2019	Sarah Blake	Naamah (Note: In 2019, Naamah won the Award for Fiction and was a finalist for Writer of the Year.)	Riverhead Books / Penguin Random House	Winner	
2019	Jacqueline Woodson	Red at the Bone	Riverhead Books / Penguin Random House	Finalist	
2019	Raymond Strom	Northern Lights	Simon & Schuster	Finalist	
2019	Robin Page	Small Silent Things	Harper Perennial/ HarperCollins	Finalist	
2019	Ruby Porter	Attraction	Text Publishing	Finalist	
2020	Emma Straub	All Adults Here	Riverhead Books	Winner	
2020	Jennifer Steil	Exile Music (Note: Exile Music was also ...)	Viking / Penguin Random House	Finalist	
2020	Katharine Coldiron	Ceremonials	Kernpunkt Press	Finalist	
2020	Rowan Hisayo Buchanan	Starling Days	The Overlook Press / Abrams	Finalist	
2020	Samantha Rajaram	The Company Daughters (Note: In 2020, The Company Daughters was a finalist for the Award for Fiction and Writer of the Year.)	Bookouture	Finalist	
2020	Zaina Arafat	You Exist Too Much	Catapult	Finalist	

=== Graphic Novels and Memoirs ===
Award winners and finalists
Year	Author	Title	Publisher	Result	Ref.
2016	Tyler Cohen	Primahood: Magenta	Stacked Deck Press / J.T. Avery Pacific	Winner	
2016	Jon Macy and Tara Madison Avery (eds.)	ALPHABET: The LGBTQAIU Creators from Prism Comics	Stacked Deck Press	Finalist	
2021	Alice Oseman	Heartstopper, Vol. 3 (Note: In 2021, the Heartstopper, Vol. 3 was a finalist for the Award for Graphic Novels and Memoirs and the Award for Teen and Young Adult.)	Graphix/Scholastic Inc.	Finalist	
2021	Courtney Cook	The Way She Feels: My Life on the Borderline in Pictures and Pieces	Tin House	Finalist	

=== Literary Fiction ===
Award winners and finalists
Year	Author	Title	Publisher	Result	Ref.
2021	Harrie Farrow	Finding Bonita	Independently Published	Finalist	
2021	Joe Okonkwo	Kiss the Scars on the Back of My Neck	Amble Press/Bywater Books	Finalist	

=== Mystery ===
Award winners and finalists
Year	Author	Title	Publisher	Result	Ref.
2014	Jamie Fessenden	Murder on the Mountain	Dreamspinner Press	Winner	
2014	AR Fiano	The Book of Joel	Astrid Fiano	Finalist	
2015	Michelle Moore and Reesa Herberth	Peripheral People (Note: In 2015, Peripheral People won the Award for Mystery and was a finalist for the Award for Speculative Fiction.)	Riptide Publishing	Winner	
2015	Casey Lawrence	Out of Order (Note: In 2015, Out of Order was a finalist for the Awards for Mystery and Teen and Young Adult.)	Harmony Ink/Dreamspinner Press	Finalist	
2016	Erica Cameron	Assassins: Discord	Triton Books/Riptide Publishing	Winner	
2016	Casey Lawrence	Order in the Court (Note: In 2016, Order in the Court was a finalist for the Awards for Mystery, and Teen and Young Adult.)	Harmony Ink Press/Dreamspinner Press	Finalist	
2017	L. A. Witt and Cari Z	Suspicious Behavior	Riptide Publishing	Winner	
2017	L. A. Witt and Cari Z	Risky Behavior	Riptide Publishing	Finalist	
2018	Cari Z and L. A. Witt	Reckless Behavior	Riptide Publishing	Winner	
2018	Rosalie Knecht	Who Is Vera Kelly?	Tin House Books	Winner	
2018	Alexandra CH Nowakowski and J. E. Sumerau	Other People's Oysters	Brill / Sense	Finalist	
2018	Cat Clarke	We Are Young (Note: In 2018, We Are Young won the Award for Teen and Young Adult and was a finalist for the Award for Mystery.)	Quercus Children's Books / Hachette Childrens Group	Finalist	
2018	Kristen Lepionka	What You Want to See	Minotaur Books / St. Martin's Press	Finalist	
2019	L. A. Witt	Blood & Bitcoin	Independently Published	Winner	
2019	Georgette Gouveia	Burying the Dead	JMS Books	Finalist	
2020 (Note: In 2020, there was a winner but no finalists.)	Tanen Jones	The Better Liar	Ballantine / Penguin Random House	Winner	
2021	Benna Bos	Investigating Helen	Flashpoint Publications	Finalist	
2021	Dea Poirier	After You Died	Agora Books / Polis Books	Finalist	

=== Non-fiction ===
Award winners and finalists
Year	Author	Title	Publisher	Result	Ref.
2012	Cheryl Burke	My Awesome Place: The Autobiography of Cheryl B (Note: In 2012, My Awesome Place won the Awards for Non-fiction and Writer of the Year.)	Topside Signature	Winner	
2012	Janet W. Hardy	Girlfag: A Life Told In Sex and Musicals (Note: In 2012, Girlfag was a finalist for the Awards for Non-Fiction and Writer of the Year.)	Beyond Binary Books	Finalist	
2013	Charles "Zan" Christensen	Anything That Loves: Comics Beyond Gay and Straight	Northwest Press	Winner	
2013	Jade Sylvan	Kissing Oscar Wilde: A Love Story In The City Of Light	Write Bloody Publishing	Finalist	
2013	Maria San Filippo	The B Word: Bisexuality in Contemporary Film and Television	Indiana University Press	Finalist	
2013	Marina Peralta with Penelope James	Barriers to Love: Embracing a Bisexual Identity	Barriers Press	Finalist	
2013	Shiri Eisner	Bi Notes for a Bisexual Revolution (Note: In 2013, Bi Notes for a Bisexual Revolution won the Award for Writer of the Year and was a finalist for the Award for Non-Fiction.)	Seal Press	Finalist	
2014	Robyn Ochs and H. Sharif Williams	Recognize: The Voices of Bisexual Men	Bisexual Resource Center	Winner	
2014	Jacob and Diane Anderson-Minshall	Queerly Beloved: A Love Story Across Gender	Bold Strokes Books	Finalist	
2014	Breanne Fahs	Valerie Solanas: The Defiant Life of the Woman Who Wrote SCUM (and Shot Andy Warhol)	The Feminist Press	Finalist	
2014	Charles M. Blow	Fire Shut Up In My Bones	Houghton Mifflin Harcourt	Finalist	
2014	Daisy Hernández	A Cup of Water Under My Bed	Beacon Press	Finalist	
2014	Edward White	The Tastemaker: Carl Van Vechten and the Birth of Modern America	Farrar, Straus and Giroux	Finalist	
2015	Maria Pallotta-Chiarolli (ed.)	Bisexuality in Education: Erasure, Exclusion and the Absence of Intersectionality	Routledge	Winner	
2015	Jillian Deri	Love's Refraction: Jealousy and Compersion in Queer Women's Polyamorous Relationships	University of Toronto Press	Finalist	
2015	Surya Monro	Bisexuality: Identities, Politics, and Theories	Palgrave/Macmillan	Finalist	
2016	Maria Pallotta-Chiarolli	Women in Relationships with Bisexual Men: Bi Men, Women	Lexington Books	Winner	
2016	Eric Anderson and Mark McCormack	The Changing Dynamics of Bisexual Men's Lives: Social Research Perspectives	Springer	Finalist	
2016	Tiggy Upland	Advice from a Wild Deuce: The Best of Ask Tiggy (Note: In 2016, Advice from a Wild Deuce won the Award for Writer of the Year and was a finalist for the Award for Non-Fiction.)	Jennifer L. Bonardi	Finalist	
2017	Telaina Eriksen	Unconditional: A Guide to Loving and Supporting Your LGBTQ Child	Mango Media	Winner	
2017	Mary-Anne McAllum	Young Bisexual Women's Experiences in Secondary Schools	Routledge	Finalist	
2017	Sarah Prager	Queer, There, and Everywhere: 23 People Who Changed the World	HarperCollins	Finalist	
2018	Sophie Lucido Johnson	Many Love	Touchstone / Simon & Schuster	Winner	
2018	Michael Amherst	Go the Way Your Blood Beats: On Truth, Bisexuality, and Desire	Repeater Books	Finalist	
2019	Esther Rapoport	From Psychoanalytic Bisexuality to Bisexual Psychoanalysis: Desiring in the Real	Routledge	Winner	
2019	Corey E. Flanders (ed.)	Under the Bisexual Umbrella: Diversity of Identity and Experience (Note: In 2019, Under the Bisexual Umbrella was a finalist for the Award for Non-Fiction and Writer of the Year.)	Routledge	Finalist	
2020	Emiel Maliepaard and Renate Baumgartner (eds.)	Bisexuality in Europe: Sexual Citizenship, Romantic Relationships, and Bi+ Identities (Note: In 2020, Bisexuality in Europe won the Award for Non-Fiction and was a finalist for Writer of the Year.)	Routledge	Winner	
2020	Carol A. Shepherd	Bi the Way: Pastoring Bisexual Christians in Europe	Easy Yoke Publishing	Finalist	
2020	Nikki Hayfield	Bisexual and Pansexual Identities: Exploring and challenging invisibility and invalidation (Note: In 2020, Bisexual and Pansexual Identities was a finalist for the Awards for Non-Fiction and Writer of the Year.)	Routledge	Finalist	

=== Poetry ===
Award winners and finalists
Year	Author	Title	Publisher	Result	Ref.
2012	Erynn Rowan Laurie	Fireflies at Absolute Zero (Note: In 2012, Fireflies at Absolute Zero won the Award for Poetry and was a finalist for Writer of the Year.)	Hiraeth Press	Winner	
2012	Donnelle McGee	Shine	Sibling Rivalry Press	Finalist	
2012	Yazmin Monet Watkins	Love Without Limits: The Bi-Laws of Love	Red Journal Publications	Finalist	
2014	Laura Foley	Joy Street	Headmistress Press	Winner	
2014	James Franco	Directing Herbert White: Poems	Graywolf Press	Finalist	
2015	Jennifer Perrine	No Confession, No Mass	University of Nebraska Press	Winner	
2015	Seaton and Duhamel	Caprice	Sibling Rivalry Press	Finalist	
2016	Ann Tweedy	The Body’s Alphabet (Note: In 2016, The Body’s Alphabet won the Award for Poetry and was a finalist for Writer of the Year.)	Headmistress Press	Winner	
2016	Cathleen Chambless	Nec(Romantic)	The Gorilla Press	Finalist	
2017	Julene Tripp Weaver	Truth Be Bold: Serenading Life & Death in the Age of AIDS	Finishing Line Press	Winner	
2017	Irene Suico Soriano	Primates from an Archipelago	Rabbit Fool Press	Finalist	
2018	Diana Hamilton	God Was Right	Ugly Duckling Presse	Winner	
2018	Duy Doan	We Play a Game (Note: In 2018, We Play a Game won Writer of the Year and was a finalist for the Award for Poetry.)	Yale University Press	Finalist	
2018	Julian Randall	Refuse	University of Pittsburgh Press	Finalist	
2018	Britteney Black Rose	Black Queer Hoe	Haymarket Books	Finalist	
2018	Jan Steckel	Like Flesh Covers Bone	Zeitgeist Press	Finalist	
2019	Rosebud Ben-Oni	turn around BRXGHT XYXS	Get Fresh Books	Winner	
2019	Laura Foley	Why I Never Finished My Dissertation	Headmistress Press	Finalist	
2019	Ariana Reines	A Sand Book	Tin House Books	Finalist	
2020	Bianca Phipps	Crown Noble	Button Poetry	Winner	
2020	Erin Carlyle	Magnolia Canopy Otherworld	Driftwood Press	Finalist	
2020	Jennifer Perrine	Again	Airlie Press	Finalist	
2021	Margaret Christakos	Dear Birch	Palimpsest Press	Finalist	
2021	Catherine Lewis	Zipless	845 Press	Finalist	
2021	Kelly Rose Pflug-Back	The Hammer of Witches	Dagger Editions/Caitlin Press	Finalist	

=== Publisher of the Year ===
Award winners and finalists
Year	Publisher	Result	Ref.
2012	Lethe Press	Winner	
2012	Riptide Publishing	Winner	
2012	Sibling Rivalry Press	Winner	
2013	Circlet Press	Winner	
2013	Riverdale Avenue Books	Winner	
2014	Bisexual Resource Center	Winner	
2014	Circlet Press	Winner	
2014	Cleis Press	Finalist	
2014	Riverdale Avenue Books	Finalist	
2015	Less Than Three Press	Winner	
2015	Macmillan Publishers	Winner	
2016	Less Than Three Press	Winner	
2016	Dreamspinner Press	Finalist	
2016	Riptide Publishing	Finalist	
2017	Duet Books/Interlude Press	Winner	
2017	Less Than Three Press	Winner	
2017	Dreamspinner Press	Finalist	
2017	Riptide Publishing	Finalist	
2018	Less Than Three Press	Winner	
2019	Simon & Schuster	Winner	
2019	Routledge	Finalist	
2020	Macmillan	Winner	
2020	Penguin Random House	Finalist	
2021	Macmillan	Finalist	
2021	Scholastic	Finalist	

=== Romance ===
Award winners and finalists
Year	Author	Title	Publisher	Result	Ref.
2014	Shari Slade and Amber Lin	One Kiss with a Rock Star	self-published	Winner	
2014	Debbie McGowan	Crying in the Rain	Beaten Track Publishing	Finalist	
2014	Jenna Galicki	The Prince of Punk Rock	Beau to Beau Publishing	Finalist	
2014	LC Chase	Let It Ride	Riptide Publishing	Finalist	
2014	May Woodworth	Heart of the Hurricane	Big World Network	Finalist	
2014	Shira Glassman	Climbing the Date Palm (Note: In 2014, Climbing the Date Palm was a finalist for the Awards for Romance and Speculative Fiction)	Prizm Books/Torquere Press	Finalist	
2015	Megan Mulry	Bound with Honor	Riptide Publishing	Winner	
2015	Amy Jo Cousins	The Girl Next Door	Samhain	Finalist	
2015	Avon Gale	Breakaway	Dreamspinner Press	Finalist	
2015	Francis Gideon	A Winter in Rome	Less Than Three Press	Finalist	
2015	J. L. Merrow	Caught!	Samhain	Finalist	
2015	Tess Bowery	She Whom I Love	Samhain Publishing	Finalist	
2016	Garrett Leigh	What Remains (Note: In 2016, What Remains won the Award for Romance and was a finalist for Writer of the Year.)	Riptide Publishing	Winner	
2016	Dahlia Adler	Out on Good Behavior (Note: In 2016, Out on Good Behavior was a finalist for the Awards for Romance and Teen and Young Adult.)	self-published	Finalist	
2016	JL Merrow	Lovers Leap	Riptide Publishing	Finalist	
2016	Jordan Brock	Change of Address	Riptide Publishing	Finalist	
2016	Keelan Ellis	Misinformation	Dreamspinner Press	Finalist	
2016	Lauren Gallagher	Stuck Landing	Riptide Publishing	Finalist	
2016	Lauren Sattersby	Rock N Soul	Riptide Publishing	Finalist	
2017	Welton B. Marsland	By the Currawong's Call	Escape Publishing/Harlequin Enterprises Australia	Winner	
2017	Amy Lane	Bonfires	Dreamspinner Press	Finalist	
2017	Chris Scully	Back To You	Riptide Publishing	Finalist	
2017	Garrett Leigh	Strays	Riptide Publishing	Finalist	
2017	Kelly Jensen	Block and Strike	Dreamspinner Press	Finalist	
2017	Vanessa North	Summer Stock	Riptide Publishing	Finalist	
2018	Lilah Suzanne	Jilted (Note: In 2018, Jilted won the Award for Romance and was a finalist for Writer of the Year.)	Interlude Press	Winner	
2018	Felicia Davin	Edge of Nowhere	Etymon Press	Finalist	
2018	L. A. Witt	The Torches We Carry	Independently Published	Finalist	
2018	Layla Reyne	Medley (Changing Lanes)	Independently Published	Finalist	
2018	Michele Engardt	The Thing About Forever	Less Than Three Press	Finalist	
2018	Nem Rowan	Rough Sleepers	Less Than Three Press	Finalist	
2019	Casey McQuiston	Red, White & Royal Blue (Note: In 2019, Red, White & Royal Blue won the Award for Romance and was a finalist for Writer of the Year.)	St. Martin's Griffin / Macmillan	Winner	
2019	S. A. McAuley	Out of the Shade	Independently Published	Winner	
2019	Molly Ringle	All the Better Part of Me	Central Avenue	Finalist	
2019	Rowan Shaw	Return	Independently Published	Finalist	
2020	Jay Hogan	Off Balance (Note: In 2020, Off Balance won the Award for Romance and was a finalist for Writer of the Year.)	Southern Lights Publishing	Winner	
2020	Garrett Leigh	Redemption	Fox Love Press	Finalist	
2020	Garrett Leigh	The Sex Coach	Fox Love Press	Finalist	
2020	J. M. Frey	The Woman Who Fell Through Time	Here There Be Publishing	Finalist	
2020	Melissa Lenhardt	The Secret of You and Me	Graydon House / Harlequin	Finalist	
2021	Alison Cochrun	The Charm Offensive	Atria Books/Simon & Schuster	Finalist	
2021	Casey McQuiston	One Last Stop	St. Martin's Griffin/Macmillan	Finalist	
2021	Noni Blake	It's Been a Pleasure	Claire Christian/Harlequin Trade Publishing	Finalist	
2021	Skye Kilaen	Tell Me Anything	Independently Published	Finalist	
2021	Skye Kilaen	The Home I Find With You (Note: In 2021, The Home I Find With You was a finalist for the Award for Romance and Writer of the Year.)	Independently Published	Finalist	

=== Speculative Fiction ===
Award winners and finalists
Year	Author	Title	Publisher	Result	Ref.
2012	Brit Mandelo	Beyond Binary: Genderqueer and Sexually Fluid Speculative Fiction	Lethe Press	Winner	
2012	Catherine Lundoff	Silver Moon	Lethe Press	Finalist	
2012	Cecilia Tan	The Poet and the Prophecy	Ravenous Romance	Finalist	
2012	Fiona Glass	Gleams of a Remoter World	Riptide Publishing	Finalist	
2013	Laura Lam	Pantomime (Note: In 2013, Pantomime won the Award for Speculative Fiction and was a finalist for the Award for Teen and Young Adult.)	Strange Chemistry	Winner	
2013	Alaya Dawn Johnson	The Summer Prince (Note: In 2013, The Summer Prince was a finalist for the Award for Speculative Fiction and Teen/Young Adult Fiction.)	Arthur A. Levine Books	Finalist	
2013	Emma Trevayne	Coda	Running Press Kids	Finalist	
2013	Francesca Lia Block	Love in The Time of Global Warming (Note: In 2013, Love in The Time of Global Warming was a finalist for the Awards for Speculative Fiction and Teen/Young Adult.)	Henry Holt and Co.	Finalist	
2013	Malinda Lo	Inheritance (Note: In 2013, Inheritance won the Award for Teen and Young Adult and was a finalist for the Award for Speculative Fiction.)	Little, Brown Books for Young Readers	Finalist	
2013	Mary Anne Mohanraj	The Stars Change	Circlet Press	Finalist	
2013	Saundra Mitchell	The Elementals	Harcourt Children's Books	Finalist	
2014	Corinne Duyvis	Otherbound (Note: In 2014, Otherbound won the Award for Speculative Fiction and was a finalist for the Award for Teen and Young Adult.)	Amulet/Abrams	Winner	
2014	Alex Jeffers	That Door is a Mischief	Lethe Press	Finalist	
2014	Julie Cox	Capricious: A Texan Tale of Love and Magic	Circlet Press	Finalist	
2014	Sarah Luddington	The Pendragon Legacy	Mirador Publishing	Finalist	
2014	Shira Glassman	Climbing the Date Palm	Prizm Books/Torquere Press	Finalist	
2015	B R Sanders	Ariah (Note: In 2015, Ariah won the Award for Speculative Fiction and was a finalist for Writer of the Year.)	Love, Sex & Merlot / The Zharmae Publishing Press	Winner	
2015	C. B. Lee	Seven Tears at High Tide (Note: In 2015, Seven Tears at High Tide was a finalist for the Awards for Speculative Fiction and Teen/Young Adult.)	Duet Books	Finalist	
2015	Lori A. Witt	The Tide of War	Riptide Publishing	Finalist	
2015	Megan Derr	The Harem Master	Less Than Three Press	Finalist	
2015	Michelle Moore and Reesa Herberth	Peripheral People	Riptide Publishing	Finalist	
2015	Shira Glassman	A Harvest of Ripe Figs	Prizm Books	Finalist	
2016	Megan Derr	The Painted Crown	Less Than Three Press	Winner	
2016	Archer Kay Leah	For the Clan	Less Than Three Press	Finalist	
2016	Foz Meadows	An Accident of Stars	Angry Robot	Finalist	
2016	KC Alexander	Necrotech	Angry Robot	Finalist	
2016	Sasha L. Miller (ed.)	Enchanted Soles	Less Than Three Press	Finalist	
2016	Zoraida Cordova	Labyrinth Lost	Sourcebooks Fire	Finalist	
2017	F. T. Lukens	The Rules and Regulations For Mediating Myths & Magic (Note: In 2017, The Rules and Regulations For Mediating Myths & Magic won the Award for Speculative Fiction and was a finalist for the Award for Teen and Young Adult.)	Duet Books/Interlude Press	Winner	
2017	Erica Cameron	Island of Exiles	Entangled Teen	Finalist	
2017	Julia Ember	The Seafarer’s Kiss	Duet/Interlude Press	Finalist	
2017	A. E. Ross	Run In The Blood	NineStar Press	Finalist	
2017	Ellen Klages	Passing Strange	Tor Books	Finalist	
2017	TS Porter	Rescues and the Rhyssa	Less Than Three Press	Finalist	
2018	J. R. Mabry	The Worship of Mystery (Note: In 2018, The Worship of Mystery won the Award for Speculative Fiction and Writer of the Year.)	The Apocryphile Press	Winner	
2018	Felicia Davin	Thornfruit	Etymon Press	Finalist	
2018	Megan Derr	Dragon Magic	Less Than Three Press	Finalist	
2018	Jeanne G’Fellers	Cleaning House	Mountain Gap Books	Finalist	
2018	William C. Tracy	The Seeds of Dissolution	Space Wizard Science Fantasy	Finalist	
2019	Rebecca Kim Wells	Shatter the Sky (Note: In 2019, Shatter the Sky won the Award for Speculative Fiction and was a finalist for Writer of the Year.)	Books for Young Readers/Simon & Schuster	Winner	
2019	FT Lukens	Monster of the Week (Note: In 2019, Monster of the Week was a finalist for the Awards for Speculative Fiction and Teen/Young Adult.)	Duet Books / Interlude Press	Finalist	
2020	V. E. Schwab	The Invisible Life of Addie LaRue	Tor Books / Tom Doherty Associates / division of Macmillan Publishers	Winner	
2020	Rashid Darden	Children of Fury	Old Gold Soul Press	Finalist	
2020	Emily M. Danforth	Plain Bad Heroines	William Morrow / HarperCollins	Finalist	
2020	Karen Osborne	Architects of Memory	Tor Books / Macmillan	Finalist	
2020	Leigh Harlen	Queens of Noise	Neon Hemlock Press	Finalist	
2021	E. J. Beaton	The Councillor	DAW	Finalist	
2021	Everina Maxwell	Winter's Orbit	Tor Books/Macmillan	Finalist	
2021	Natasha Pulley	The Kingdoms	Bloomsbury Publishing	Finalist	
2021	Shelley Parker-Chan	She Who Became the Sun	Tor Books/Macmillan	Finalist	
2021	Avi Silver	Three Seeking Stars	Molewhale Press	Finalist	
2021	Xiran Jay Zhao	Iron Widow (Note: In 2021, Iron Widow was a finalist for the Awards for Speculative Fiction, and Teen and Young Adult.)	Penguin Teen	Finalist	

=== Teen and Young Adult ===
Award winners and finalists
Year	Author	Title	Publisher	Result	Ref.
2013	Malinda Lo	Inheritance	Little, Brown Books for Young Readers	Winner	
2013	Alaya Dawn Johnson	The Summer Prince	Arthur A. Levine Books	Finalist	
2013	Bill Konigsberg	Openly Straight	Arthur A. Levine Books	Finalist	
2013	Francesca Lia Block	Love in The Time of Global Warming	Henry Holt and Co.	Finalist	
2013	Laura Lam	Pantomime	Strange Chemistry	Finalist	
2013	M. G. Higgins	Bi-Normal	Saddleback Educational Publishing	Finalist	
2014	Nora Olsen	Frenemy of the People	Soliloquy/Bold Strokes Books	Winner	
2014	Corinne Duyvis	Otherbound	Amulet/Abrams	Finalist	
2015	Hannah Moskowitz	Not Otherwise Specified (Note: In 2015, Not Otherwise Specified won the Award for Teen/Young Adult and was a finalist for Writer of the Year.)	Simon Pulse/Simon & Schuster	Winner	
2015	C. B. Lee	Seven Tears at High Tide	Duet Books	Finalist	
2015	Casey Lawrence	Out of Order	Harmony Ink/Dreamspinner Press	Finalist	
2015	Erica Yang	Bad Idea	Queerteen Press/JMS Books	Finalist	
2016	Alison Cherry	Look Both Ways	Delacorte Press / Random House Children's Books	Winner	
2016	C. B. Lee	Not Your Sidekick	Duet/Interlude Press	Finalist	
2016	Casey Lawrence	Order in the Court	Harmony Ink Press/Dreamspinner Press	Finalist	
2016	Dahlia Adler	Out on Good Behavior	Self Published	Finalist	
2016	Emily O'Beirne	The Sum of These Things	Ylva Publishing	Finalist	
2016	Jamie Deacon	Caught Inside	Beaten Track Publishing	Finalist	
2016	Suzanne van Rooyen	Obscura Burning (Note: In 2016, Obscura Burning was a finalist for the Award for Teen/Young Adult and Writer of the Year.)	Harmony Ink/Dreamspinner Press	Finalist	
2017	Sarah Rees Brennan	In Other Lands	Big Mouth House/Small Beer Press	Winner	
2017	Allison Raskin and Gaby Dunn	I Hate Everyone But You	Wednesday Books	Finalist	
2017	Carrie Pack	Grrrls on the Side	Duet Books/Interlude Press	Finalist	
2017	F. T. Lukens	The Rules and Regulations For Mediating Myths & Magic	Duet Books/Interlude Press	Finalist	
2017	Julie Aitcheson	Being Roy	Harmony Ink Press	Finalist	
2018	Cat Clarke	We Are Young	Quercus Children's Books / Hachette Childrens Group	Winner	
2018	Gene Gant	A Love Song for Mr. Dakota	Harmony Ink Press / Dreamspinner Press	Finalist	
2018	J. E. Sumerau	Palmetto Rose	Brill / Sense	Finalist	
2018	Lisa Walker	Paris Syndrome	Angus & Robertson / HarperCollins Publishers Australia	Finalist	
2018	Mia Kerick	The Weekend Bucket List	Duet Books / Interlude Press	Finalist	
2019	Zack Smedley	Deposing Nathan	Page Street Kids	Winner	
2019	FT Lukens	Monster of the Week	Duet Books / Interlude Press	Finalist	
2019	JC Garton	The Mover	Riversong Books / Sulis International	Finalist	
2020	Nita Tyndall	Who I Was with Her (Note: In 2020, Who I Was with Her won the Award for Teen/Young Adult and was a finalist for Writer of the Year.)	HarperTeen / Harper Collins	Winner	
2020	Gabrielle Harbowy	Hearts Are Jerks	Heart Bow Books	Finalist	
2020	Leah Johnson	You Should See Me in a Crown	Scholastic Press	Finalist	
2020	Sophie Gonzales	Only Mostly Devastated	Wednesday Books / Macmillan	Finalist	
2020	Zan Romanoff	Look	Dial Books / Penguin	Finalist	
2021	Alice Oseman	Heartstopper, Vol. 3	Graphix / Scholastic Inc.	Finalist	
2021	Emily Martin	Five Ways to Fall Out of Love	Inkyard / Harlequin	Finalist	
2021	Jay Coles	Things We Couldn't Say	Scholastic Press / Scholastic Inc.	Finalist	
2021	Jessica Verdi	Follow Your Arrow	Scholastic Press / Scholastic Inc.	Finalist	
2021	Kate Brauning	The Ballad of Dinah Caldwell	Page Street Publishing	Finalist	
2021	Xiran Jay Zhao	Iron Widow	Penguin Teen	Finalist	

=== Writer of the Year ===
Award winners and finalists
Year	Author	Title	Publisher	Result	Ref.
2012	Cheryl Burke	My Awesome Place: The Autobiography of Cheryl B	Topside Signature	Winner	
2012	Annette Lapointe	Whitetail Shooting Gallery	Anvil Press Publishers	Finalist	
2012	Basil Papademos	Mount Royal, There's Nothing Harder than Love	Tightrope Books	Finalist	
2012	Brit Mandelo	Beyond Binary: Genderqueer and Sexually Fluid Speculative Fiction	Lethe Press	Finalist	
2012	Catherine Lundoff	Silver Moon	Lethe Press	Finalist	
2012	Cecilia Tan	The Poet and the Prophecy	Ravenous Romance	Finalist	
2012	Erynn Rowan Laurie	Fireflies at Absolute Zero	Hiraeth Press	Finalist	
2012	Janet W. Hardy	Girlfag: A Life Told In Sex and Musicals	Beyond Binary Books	Finalist	
2012	Mykola Dementiuk	Times Square Queer: Tales of Bad Boys in the Big Apple	Renaissance eBooks	Finalist	
2013	Shiri Eisner	Bi Notes for a Bisexual Revolution	Seal Press	Winner	
2013	Clive Davis with Anthony DeCurtis	The Soundtrack of My Life	Simon & Schuster	Finalist	
2013	Ed Kurtz	A Wind of Knives	Snubnose Press	Finalist	
2013	Jean Roberta	The Flight of the Black Swan	Lethe Press	Finalist	
2013	Livia Ellis	Memoirs of a Gigolo Omnibus, Vol. 1-4	Riverdale Avenue Books/ Desire	Finalist	
2013	Marina Peralta with Penelope James	Barriers to Love: Embracing a Bisexual Identity	Barriers Press	Finalist	
2013	Rachel Kramer Bussel (ed.)	Twice the Pleasure: Bisexual Women's Erotica	Cleis Press	Finalist	
2014	Robyn Ochs and H. Sharif Williams (eds.)	Recognize: The Voices of Bisexual Men	Bisexual Resource Center	Winner	
2014	Alan Cumming	Not My Father's Son	Dey Street Books/HarperCollins Publishers	Finalist	
2014	Charles M. Blow	Fire Shut Up In My Bones	Houghton Mifflin Harcourt	Finalist	
2014	Livia Ellis	Memoirs of a Gigolo, Second Omnibus, Vol. 5-7	Riverdale Avenue Books	Finalist	
2014	Daisy Hernández	A Cup of Water Under My Bed	Beacon Press	Finalist	
2014	Sheela Lambert (ed.)	Best Bi Short Stories	Gressive Press/Circlet Press	Finalist	
2015	Kate Evans	Call It Wonder: An Odyssey of Love, Sex, Spirit, and Travel	Coyote Creek Books	Winner	
2015	B R Sanders	Ariah	The Zharmae Publishing Press	Finalist	
2015	Hannah Moskowitz	Not Otherwise Specified	Simon Pulse/Simon & Schuster	Finalist	
2016	Tiggy Upland	Advice from a Wild Deuce: The Best of Ask Tiggy	Jennifer L. Bonardi	Winner	
2016	Ann Tweedy	The Body’s Alphabet	Headmistress Press	Finalist	
2016	Erin Judge	Vow of Celibacy	Rare Bird Books	Finalist	
2016	Garrett Leigh	What Remains	Riptide Publishing	Finalist	
2016	Lauren Gallagher	The Best Laid Plans	Samhain Publishing	Finalist	
2016	Suzanne van Rooyen	Obscura Burning	Harmony Ink/Dreamspinner Press	Finalist	
2017	Peggy Seeger	First Time Ever	Faber & Faber	Winner	
2017	Carmen Maria Machado	Her Body and Other Parties	Graywolf Press	Finalist	
2017	Erin McRae and Racheline Maltese	The Art of Three	Avian30	Finalist	
2017	Karen Connelly	The Change Room	Random House/ PenguinRandomHouse	Finalist	
2017	Monica Meneghetti	What the Mouth Wants: A Memoir of Food, Love and Belonging	Dagger Editions/Caitlin Press	Finalist	
2017	Sylvia Brownrigg	Pages for Her	Counterpoint	Finalist	
2018	Duy Doan	We Play a Game	Yale University Press	Winner	
2018	Elaine Castillo	America Is Not the Heart	Viking / Penguin Random House	Winner	
2018	J.R. Mabry	The Worship of Mystery	The Apocryphile Press	Winner	
2018	Kate Evans	Target	Coyote Creek Books	Finalist	
2018	Lilah Suzanne	Jilted	Interlude Press	Finalist	
2018	Rachel Wiley	Nothing Is Okay	Button Poetry	Finalist	
2019	Rosalind Chase	Lot's Wife: An Erotic Retelling	Under Hill Press	Winner	
2019	Casey McQuiston	Red, White & Royal Blue	St. Martin's Griffin / Macmillan	Finalist	
2019	Corey E. Flanders (ed.)	Under the Bisexual Umbrella: Diversity of Identity and Experience	Routledge	Finalist	
2019	Rebecca Kim Wells	Shatter the Sky	Books for Young Readers / Simon & Schuster	Finalist	
2019	Sarah Blake	Naamah	Riverhead Books / Penguin Random House	Finalist	
2020	Molly Wizenberg	The Fixed Stars	Abrams Press	Winner	
2020	Celia Stahr	Frida in America	St. Martin's Press / Macmillan	Finalist	
2020	Emiel Maliepaard and Renate Baumgartner (eds.)	Bisexuality in Europe: Sexual Citizenship, Romantic Relationships, and Bi+ Identities	Routledge	Finalist	
2020	Jay Hogan	Off Balance	Southern Lights Publishing	Finalist	
2020	Jennifer Steil	Exile Music	Viking / Penguin Random House	Finalist	
2020	Nikki Hayfield	Bisexual and Pansexual Identities: Exploring and challenging invisibility and invalidation	Routledge	Finalist	
2020	Nita Tyndall	Who I Was with Her	HarperTeen / Harper Collins	Finalist	
2020	Samantha Irby	Wow, No Thank You	Vintage / Penguin Random House	Finalist	
2020	Samantha Rajaram	The Company Daughters	Bookouture	Finalist	
2021	Skye Kilaen	The Home I Find With You	Independently Published	Finalist	
2021	Catherine Lewis	Zipless	845 Press	Finalist	
2021	Lois Shearing	Bi the Way: The Bisexual Guide to Life	Jessica Kingsley	Finalist	
2021	Jen Winston	Greedy: Notes from a Bisexual Who Wants Too Much	Atria Books/Simon & Schuster	Finalist	
