= Bisexual literature =

Literature that addresses bisexuality and biromanticism

Bisexual literature is literature that addresses or portrays bisexuality or biromanticism. This includes characters, plot lines, and/or themes portraying bisexual behavior or bisexuality.

Fiction that falls into this category may be of any genre, such as historical fiction, science fiction, fantasy, horror, and romance.

== Overview ==
Bisexual literature includes works that feature bisexuality as the main plot point, as well as works with major bisexual characters.

Though bisexuality has appeared in literary works as early as 1748, in John Cleland's Fanny Hill, the mid-1990s marked a rise in publications about bisexuality, often at the influence of the new appearance of bisexual organizations. Much of this work was a response to bisexuality's absence from the historical record and from the contemporary moment. A result of this is the attempts of contemporary accounts to legitimize bisexuality as a sexual identity.

Much of bisexual literature focuses on "highlighting bisexuality's presence in history, the specificity of bisexual experiences, and its existence as a viable form of sexual identification".

Though there are notable examples of both men and women expressing interest in both genders romantically and sexually in early literary works, the recent catalyst of gay rights movements inspired a surge of more LGBT literature. Though most of these literary works focused on lesbian and gay relationships, bisexuality is slowly making a rise and becoming more visible in literature and individuals.

== History ==
=== Pre-1900 ===
One of the earliest known examples of bisexuality in literature is Fanny Hill by John Cleland. In the novel, the titular character Fanny has "exciting and satisfying sexual relations with other women as well as with men." During this time period, homosexuality was considered an action rather than part of an identity, and so instances of any homosexuality, including bisexuality, were rare in literary works.

A more famous example of characters implied to be bisexual includes Dorian Gray and supporting characters from The Picture of Dorian Gray by Oscar Wilde. Wilde himself was married with children but was understood by his contemporaries to have had extra-marital relationships with both women and men. Sometime after the publication of The Picture of Dorian Gray, Wilde was summoned to court on accusations of gross indecency for his portrayal of homosexual overtones and rumors about his own gay relationships. In modern adaptations of the story, Dorian is often portrayed as bisexual.

Kate Chopin's The Awakening portrays Edna Pontellier, who is shown to be "capable of responding physically to a woman and of loving women" despite having numerous sexual relationships with men. Though her main character's sexuality is never explicitly stated, Chopin knew or read about homosexuality and bisexuality in the works of authors such as American poet Walt Whitman or French story writer Guy de Maupassant, and this likely influenced her character's sexual ambiguity.

=== 1900s ===
The 1900s saw an increase in bisexual literature, although not by much, as many authors followed the trend of addressing radical and controversial topics in their writing. In 1926, Richard Bruce Nugent published his experimental form short story "Smoke, Lilies, and Jade", which describes the struggle of a man understanding his attraction to multiple people, particularly a man he nicknames as "Beauty". Nevertheless, however, the early part of this era, much like the last, saw a lack of recognizing or misidentifying bisexuality in literature. Gore Vidal was a notable author, essayist, and public intellectual who identified as bisexual and wrote The City and the Pillar, the 1948 novel that described bisexuality as the "natural" human state. Bisexual characters also appeared in the novels of key figure and African-American author James Baldwin, specifically his 1956 novel Giovanni's Room.

Although the 1960s showed accomplishments for bisexuals in building the LGBT rights movement of the time, there was little addition to bisexual literature. Some novels, such as Stranger in a Strange Land and The Left Hand of Darkness, portrayed characters as races without gender or a clear gender, who were bisexual as a result. This concept continued through more novels in the following years. During the 1970s, bisexuals gained more recognition in media, and as a result, there were many publications on the nature of bisexuality. Both Time and Newsweek magazines ran stories on "bisexual chic", drawing mainstream attention to bisexuality. As a result, there were more appearances of bisexuality in literature. In 1976, the first of Anne Rice's The Vampire Chronicles was published, and the series portrayed several main characters as bisexual or biromantic.

In the 1980s, the bisexual movement shifted toward receiving greater recognition. Activists worked to distinguish bisexuality from sexual swinging. One of the reasons mainstream media had this misconception is novels and literature rarely identified bisexuality even while portraying it. Often it is only implied that a character is bisexual rather than shown or explicitly stated. Towards the end of the decade, the mainstream press released some stories concerning the "AIDS threat bisexuals posed to heterosexuals."

In the 1990s, bisexual literature became more prominent. The USA's first national bisexual quarterly magazine, Anything That Moves: Beyond The Myths of Bisexuality, founded by Karla Rossi, was first published in 1991 by the Bay Area Bisexual Network. One of the most influential books in the history of the modern bisexual rights movement, Bi Any Other Name: Bisexual People Speak Out, an anthology edited by Loraine Hutchins and Lani Ka'ahumanu, was also published in 1991. BiNet USA led a campaign after multiple bisexual works of literature were forced to compete in the lesbian categories of the Lambda Literary Awards. In 1995, Harvard University Shakespeare professor Marjorie Garber argued the academic case most people would be bisexual if not for "repression, religion, repugnance, denial, laziness, shyness, lack of opportunity, premature specialization, a failure of imagination, or a life already full to the brim with erotic experiences, albeit with only one person, or only one gender" with her book Vice Versa: Bisexuality and the Eroticism of Everyday Life. In 1994, a monthly print journal called Bi Community News began publishing in the UK. In 2000, bisexual activist Dr. Fritz Klein founded the Journal of Bisexuality, the first academic, quarterly journal on bisexuality. However, other media proved more mixed in terms of representing bisexuals.

=== 2000s to the present ===
At the beginning of the 21st century, bisexuality continued to be overshadowed by gay and lesbian literature despite the progressive burst of LGBT literature. While many of the examples of bisexuality in literature during this time are still science-fiction and fantasy, taking place in worlds where opinions on sexuality are different from societal norms, in more recent years bisexuality has started to appear more in contemporary fiction. The 2000s also saw the rise of LGBTQ+ young adult literature, since teen novels presented a platform for coming of age stories, and thus coming out stories. In 2014, Bisexuality: Making the Invisible Visible in Faith Communities by Marie Alford-Harkey and Debra W. Haffner, the first book of its kind, was published.

== Notable publications ==
=== Fiction ===
- "Smoke, Lilies and Jade" by Richard Bruce Nugent (1926)
- The Color Purple by Alice Walker (1982)
- Giovanni's Room by James Baldwin (1956)
- Maurice by E. M. Forster (1971)
- Orlando by Virginia Woolf (1928)
- Another Country by James Baldwin (1962)
- Split Screen, by Brent Hartinger (Winner of the Lambda Literary Award for Bisexual Literature in 2007)
- Call Me by Your Name by André Aciman (2007) (Winner of the Lambda Literary Award for Gay Fiction in 2007, with the bisexual protagonist)
- Holy Communion by Mykola Dementiuk (Winner of the Lambda Literary Award for Bisexual Fiction in 2009)
- Love You Two by Maria Pallotta-Chiarolli (Winner of the Lambda Literary Award for Bisexual Fiction in 2009)
- The Lunatic, the Lover, and the Poet by Myrlin Hermes (Winner of the Lambda Literary Award for Bisexual Fiction in 2010)
- Boyfriends with Girlfriends by Alex Sanchez (2011)
- The Correspondence Artist by Barbara Browning (Winner of the Lambda Literary Award for Bisexual Fiction in 2011)
- In One Person by John Irving (Winner of the Lambda Literary Award for Bisexual Literature in 2012)
- My Education by Susan Choi (Winner of the Lambda Literary Award for Bisexual Fiction in 2013)
- Hild by Nicola Griffith (2013)
- Give It to Me by Ana Castillo (Winner of the Lambda Literary Award for Bisexual Fiction in 2014)
- The Life and Death of Sophie Stark by Anna North (Winner of the Lambda Literary Award for Bisexual Literature in 2015)
- Broken Earth trilogy by N. K. Jemisin (2015–2017)
- Marrow Island by Alexis M. Smith (Winner of the Lambda Literary Award for Bisexual Fiction in 2016)
- Star-Crossed by Barbara Dee (2017)
- The Seven Husbands of Evelyn Hugo by Taylor Jenkins Reid (2017)
- Sirens & Muses by Antonia Angress (2022)

=== Non-fiction ===
- Bi Any Other Name: Bisexual People Speak Out by Loraine Hutchins and Lani Ka'ahumanu (1991)
- Getting Bi: Voices of Bisexuals Around the World by Robyn Ochs (2005)
- The Bisexual's Guide to the Universe by Michael Szymanski and Nicole Kristal (First winner of the Bisexual Literature category of the Lambda Literary Award in 2006)
- Open by Jenny Block (Winner of the Lambda Literary Award for Bisexual Literature in 2008)
- Leaving India: My Family's Journey From Five Villages to Five Continents by Minal Hajratwala (Winner of the Lambda Literary Award for Bisexual Non-Fiction in 2009)
- Border Sexualities, Border Families in Schools by Maria Pallotta-Chiarolli (Winner of the Lambda Literary Award for Bisexual Non-Fiction in 2010)
- My Awesome Place: The Autobiography of Cheryl B by Cheryl Burke (Winner of the Lambda Literary Award for Bisexual Literature in 2012)
- The B Word: Bisexuality in Contemporary Film and Television by Maria San Filippo (Winner of the Lambda Literary Award for Bisexual Non-Fiction in 2013)
- Fire Shut Up in My Bones by Charles M. Blow (Winner of the Lambda Literary Award for Bisexual Non-Fiction in 2014)
- Bi: Notes for a Bisexual Revolution by Shiri Eisner (Nominee of the Lambda Literary Award for Bisexual Non-Fiction in 2014)
- Irrepressible: The Jazz Age Life of Henrietta Bingham by Emily Bingham (Winner of the Lambda Literary Award for Bisexual Literature in 2015)
- Black Dove: Mamá, Mi'jo, and Me by Ana Castillo (Winner of the Lambda Literary Award for Bisexual Non-Fiction in 2016)
- How Not to Be a Boy by Robert Webb (memoir of a British comedian released in 2017)
- Bi: The Hidden Culture, History, and Science of Bisexuality by Julia Shaw, PhD (published 2022)

=== Poetry ===
- The Horizontal Poet by Jan Steckel (Winner of the Lambda Literary Award for Bisexual Non-Fiction in 2011)
- Mouth to Mouth by Abigail Child (First Winner of the Lambda Literary Award for Bisexual Poetry in 2016)

== Publishers ==
There are currently no publishers solely devoted to producing bisexual books. Many publishers specializing in LGBTQ fiction, rather than specifically gay or lesbian fiction, have strong commitments to producing bisexual literature. The following is an incomplete list of publishers that have been recognized by the bisexual community for producing quality bisexual content.

=== Less than Three Publishers ===
Winner of the 2016 and 2015 Bisexual Book Awards' Publisher of the Year. LT3 is a growing publisher in the LGBTQ romance community.

=== Bisexual Resource Center ===
The Bisexual Resource Center is a 501 non-profit educational organization headquartered in Boston, Massachusetts, USA, that has served the Bisexual Community since 1985. It tied for the 2014 Bisexual Book Awards' Publisher of the Year.

=== Circlet Press ===
Circlet Press is a publishing house in Cambridge, Massachusetts. It was founded by Cecilia Tan, who is also its manager. It specializes in science fiction erotica, a once uncommon genre, and its publications often feature BDSM themes. It tied for the 2014 Bisexual Book Awards' Publisher of the Year.

=== Riverdale Avenue Books ===
Riverdale was named 2014 BiPublisher of the Year by the Bi-Writers Association and won the 2013 Bisexual book Awards' Publisher of the Year. Its imprint, Riverdale/Magnus, is an imprint of LGBT titles.

=== Lethe Press ===
Lethe Press is an independent publishing house specializing in speculative fiction and books of queer interest. It tied in the 2012 Bisexual Book Awards' Publisher of the Year.

=== Riptide Publishing ===
Riptide Publishing is a publisher of LGBTQ fiction created by industry veterans and LGBTQ authors. It seeks to integrate positive LGBTQ representation into mainstream media. It tied for the 2012 Bisexual Book Awards' Publisher of the Year.

=== Sibling Rivalry Press ===
Sibling Rivalry Press is an inclusive publishing house specializing in LGBTQ authors and artists. It was founded in 2010 by Bryan Borland and based in Little Rock, Arkansas. It is the only press to ever win Lambda Literary Awards in both Gay Poetry and Lesbian Poetry. It tied for the 2012 Bisexual Book Awards' Publisher of the Year.

== Children's and young adult fiction ==
There is a notable lack of children or early reader books that discuss bisexuality, though there are numerous other LGBT-centric books, primarily featuring homosexual relationships and parents. Over the past 30 years, the number of books written in English for children and young people that portray lesbian, gay, bisexual, transgender, and otherwise queer (LGBT) characters has increased exponentially. However, the few bisexual characters appearing in literature meant for young readers are often portrayed negatively and under-analyzed. In a 2014 article for the Journal of Bisexuality, author B. J. Epstein analyzed several children's books to find "bisexuality is apparently still beyond acceptable and 'normal'." Throughout the 1980s and early 1990s, most of the books with LGBT characters were picture books, aimed at young children and portraying the LGBT characters as parents. In more recent years, LGBT characters have increasingly been included in books for older children and young adults. The characters are now not just parents, but young people themselves. One of the reasons it is difficult to identify bisexuals in children's literature is the tendency to focus on one relationship per character creates the perception of the character being either straight or gay.

=== Picture books ===
As of 2020, there are no known fiction picture books with bisexual characters. Most nonfiction works portraying historical people who had relationships with members of more than one gender tend to omit those elements of those characters' biographies. One picture book biography of Frida Kahlo's life, Nadia Fink's Frida Kahlo for Girls and Boys, published in English in 2017 by Books del Sur, mentions that Kahlo loved both men and women.

=== Middle grade ===
A growing number of books aimed at middle grade readers include bi characters, although these books have tended not to name these characters as explicitly bisexual. In 2016, Rick Riordan's The Hidden Oracle was released. The book, the first in Riordan's The Trials of Apollo series which takes place in his larger Camp Half-Blood Chronicles universe, is narrated by the god Apollo, who alludes to having had numerous past relationships with men and women. Barbara Dee's Star-Crossed and Lisa Jenn Bigelow's Drum Roll, Please were published in 2017 and 2018, respectively. Both stories star a middle school-aged protagonist who has feelings for classmates of different genders.

=== Teen fiction ===
In the case of teen, or young adult (YA) fiction, the situation is different. There is more bi-visibility, but often they are not described positively, nor are they shown living happy bisexual lives. In David Leviathan's Boy Meets Boy, the main character is shown to resent the word bisexual because it makes it sound like he is divided. In another novel, Maureen Johnson's The Bermudez Triangle, one character is described as a "bisexual sex addict" and the main character Avery refuses to identify as bisexual because it makes her feel "gluttonous". In Nancy Garden's The Year They Burned the Books, bisexuality is essentially shown as a temporary state of confusion, with both characters unsure of their sexuality and not seeing it as a possibility.

There are still positive representations of bisexuality in both contemporary and speculative YA fiction. Examples of positive representations include the following:

- Our Own Private Universe by Robin Talley
- Queens of Geek by Jen Wilde
- The Gentleman's Guide to Vice and Virtue by Mackenzi Lee
- Ramona Blue by Julie Murphy
- Wild Beauty by Anna-Marie McLemore
- Not Your Sidekick by C.B. Lee
- Coda by Emma Trevayne
- Not Otherwise Specified by Hannah Moskowitz
- Otherbound by Corinne Duyvis
- Empress of the World by Sara Ryan
- The Mortal Instruments series by Cassandra Clare
- Of Fire and Stars by Audrey Coulthurst
- The Raven Cycle by Maggie Stiefvater
- Leah on the Offbeat by Becky Albertalli
- ”Heartstopper” by Alice Oseman

== See also ==
- Gay literature
- Lesbian literature
- List of media portrayals of bisexuality
