= The Ambassador's Wife =

The Ambassador's Wife may refer to:

- The Ambassador's Wife (Gore novel), an 1842 novel by Catherine Gore
- The Ambassador's Wife (Steil novel), a 2015 novel by Jennifer Steil
- The Ambassador's Wife (film), a 1955 West German spy drama film
