= Rhys Ford =

American novelist

- Occupation: Author
- Genre: Mystery, suspense, thriller, urban fantasy, contemporary, romance

Website
- rhysford.com

Rhys Ford is an American author of LGBT mysteries, urban fantasy, thrillers, and contemporary fiction. She was born and raised in Hawai'i and is of Hawaiian and mixed race descent. After graduating from The Kamehameha Schools on O'ahu and attending the University of Hawai'i at Hilo, Ford moved to San Diego, California. She was nominated for a Lambda Literary Award for Gay Fiction for her novel Murder and Mayhem in 2016 and for Tramps and Thieves in 2018.

Her first novel, Dirty Kiss was published by Dreamspinner Press in July 2011.

== Published works ==
=== The Dirty Series aka Cole McGinnis Series ===
Title	ISBN	Publication Date	Genre
Dirty Kiss	ISBN 978-1-61581-959-1	July 1, 2011	Mystery/Suspense
Dirty Secret	ISBN 978-1-61372-776-8	Sept 28,2012	Mystery/Suspense
Dirty Laundry	ISBN 978-1-62380-632-3	April 19, 2013	Mystery/Suspense
Dirty Deeds	ISBN 978-1-62798-740-0	Mar 28, 2014	Mystery/Suspense
Down and Dirty	ISBN 978-1-63216-615-9	Jan 2, 2015	Mystery/Suspense
Dirty Heart	ISBN 978-1-63477-027-9	Mar 21,2016	Mystery/Suspense
Dirty Bites	Free Publication	Dec 5, 2016	Short story collection

=== McGinnis Investigations Series ===
Title	ISBN	Publication Date	Genre
Back in Black	ISBN 978-1-64405-826-8	Feb 4, 2020	Mystery/Suspense

=== Sinners Series ===
Title	ISBN	Publication Date	Genre
Sinners Gin	ISBN 978-1-62380-249-3	Dec 24, 2012	Mystery/Suspense
Whiskey and Wry	ISBN 978-1-62798-079-1	Aug 19, 2013	Mystery/Suspense
The Devil's Brew	ISBN 978-1-62798-768-4	May 21, 2014	Contemporary Novella
Tequila Mockingbird	ISBN 978-1-63216-014-0	Jun 27, 2014	Mystery/Suspense
Sloe Ride	ISBN 978-1-63476-528-2	Sep 4, 2015	Mystery/Suspense
Absinthe of Malice	ISBN 978-1-63477-326-3	Jun 22, 2016	Mystery/Suspense
Sin and Tonic	ISBN 978-1-64080-623-8	May 15, 2018	Mystery/Suspense
'Nother Sip of Gin	ISBN 978-1-64405-893-0	Aug 18, 2020	A Sinners Gin Anthology

=== 415 Ink Series ===
Title	ISBN	Publication Date	Genre
Rebel	ISBN 978-1-64080-384-8	Dec 29, 2017	Contemporary Romance
Savior	ISBN 978-1-64080-861-4	Sept 18, 2018	Contemporary Romance
Hellion	ISBN 978-1-64405-630-1	Sept 17, 2019	Contemporary Romance

=== Kai Gracen Series ===
Title	ISBN	Publication Date	Genre
Black Dog Blues	ISBN 978-1-63216-354-7	February 3, 2015	Urban Fantasy
Mad Lizard Mambo	ISBN 978-1-63477-744-5	September 10, 2016	Urban Fantasy
Jacked Cat Jive	ISBN 978-1-64108-136-8	March 5, 2019	Urban Fantasy
Silk Dragon Salsa	ISBN 978-1-64405-870-1	July 14, 2020	Urban Fantasy

=== Half Moon Bay Series ===
Title	ISBN	Publication Date	Genre
Fish Stick Fridays	ISBN 978-1-62380-948-5	Nov 30, 2015	Mystery/Suspense
Hanging the Stars	ISBN 978-1-63477-898-5	Dec 5, 2016	Mystery/Suspense
Tutus and Tinsel	ISBN 978-1-64405-151-1	Dec 21, 2018	Novela

=== Murder and Mayhem Series ===
Title	ISBN	Publication Date	Genre
Murder and Mayhem	ISBN 978-1-63476-223-6	Jun 5, 2015	Mystery/Suspense
Tramps and Thieves	ISBN 978-1-64080-038-0	Sep 18, 2017	Mystery/Suspense
Cops and Comix	ISBN 978-1-64405-152-8	Nov 16, 2018	Short Story

=== Hellsinger Series ===
Title	ISBN	Publication Date	Genre
Fish and Ghosts	ISBN 978-1-62798-416-4	Dec 30, 2013	Urban Fantasy
Duck Duck Ghost	ISBN 978-1-63216-219-9	Sep 8, 2014	Urban Fantasy

=== Ramen Assassin Series ===
Title	ISBN	Publication Date	Genre
Ramen Assassin	ISBN 978-1-64405-473-4	Jun 25, 2019	Mystery/Suspense

=== Wayward Wolves Series ===
Title	ISBN	Publication Date	Genre
Once Upon a Wolf	ISBN 978-1-64080-514-9	Feb 16, 2018	Paranormal Romance

=== Stand Alone Novels, Novellas, Collaborations ===
Title	ISBN	Publication Date	Genre
Clockwork Tangerine	ISBN 978-1-62798-419-5	Feb 19, 2014	Steampunk
Grand Adventures	ISBN 978-1-62798-996-1	Mar 31, 2014	Anthology
Ink and Shadows	ISBN 978-1-63476-017-1	July 7, 2015	Urban Fantasy
There's This Guy	ISBN 978-1-63533-499-9	March 17, 2017	Contemporary
Devil Take Me	ISBN 978-1-64080-887-4	Oct 16, 2018	Urban Fantasy Anthology
Wonderland City	ISBN 978-1-64405-716-2	Apr 28, 2020	Urban Fantasy Novella
Bad, Dad, and Dangerous	ISBN 978-1-64405-712-4	Oct 6, 2020	Paranormal Romance Anthology

== Awards ==
- 2013 Library Journal, Best Ebooks Romance, Black Dog Blues, Won
- 28th Lambda Literary Awards, Gay Mystery, Murder and Mayhem, Finalist.
- 2017 Paranormal Romance Guild Award Winner
- 30th Lambda Literary Awards, Gay Mystery, Tramps and Thieves, Finalist.
- 2018 Paranormal Romance Guild Award Winner
