= Myths and Magic =

Young adult fantasy novel dulogy by F. T. Lukens

Myths & Magic
- The Rules and Regulations For Mediating Myths & Magic (2017); Monster of the Week (2019)
- Author: F. T. Lukens
- Language: English
- Genre: Fantasy
- Publisher: Duet Books
- Published: September 7, 2017 – October 15, 2019
- No. of books: 2

The Myths and Magic duology is a two-book young adult fantasy series by author F. T. Lukens that includes The Rules and Regulations For Mediating Myths & Magic (2017) and Monster of the Week (2019). The first book in the series won the 2017 INDIES Award for Young Adult Fiction, 2018 Bisexual Book Award for Speculative Fiction, and 2018 IBPA Benjamin Franklin Award for Teen Fiction.

== The Rules and Regulations For Mediating Myths & Magic (2017) ==
The Rules and Regulations For Mediating Myths & Magic was published by Duet Books on September 7, 2017.

According to Kirkus Reviews, the novel's strengths are the "content, pace, and character", which "outweigh intermittent and repetitive pronouncement of clichés or reminders of a character’s weirdness".

== Monster of the Week (2019) ==
Monster of the Week was published October 15, 2019 by Duet Books.

Kirkus Reviews discussed how "sexual orientation and gender identity are layered freely within the narrative", pointing to how the main character, Bridger, "is open about his commitment to his boyfriend and his attraction to women", which contrasts the "closeted existence the magical community has to lead as a matter of self-preservation".

== Awards and honors ==
The Rules and Regulations For Mediating Myths & Magic was included on the American Library Association's 2019 Rainbow List.

Awards for the Myths and Magic books
Year		Award	Result	Ref.
2017	The Rules and Regulations For Mediating Myths & Magic	Cybils Award for Young Adult	Finalist	
2017	The Rules and Regulations For Mediating Myths & Magic	INDIES Award for Young Adult Fiction	gold	
2018	The Rules and Regulations For Mediating Myths & Magic	Bisexual Book Award for Speculative Fiction	Won	
2018	The Rules and Regulations For Mediating Myths & Magic	Bisexual Book Award for Teen and Young Adult	Finalist	
2018	The Rules and Regulations For Mediating Myths & Magic	Gaylactic Spectrum Award for Best Novel	Nominated	
2018	The Rules and Regulations For Mediating Myths & Magic	IBPA Benjamin Franklin Award for Teen Fiction	Won	
2019	Monster of the Week	Bisexual Book Award for Speculative Fiction	Finalist	
2019	Monster of the Week	Bisexual Book Award for Teen and Young Adult	Finalist	
