= J. E. Sumerau =

American non-binary trans woman novelist and scholar

J. E. Sumerau is an American non-binary trans woman who is a novelist and scholar. Their work focuses on "the intersections of sexualities, gender, religion, and health in the reproduction of inequalities that facilitate patterns of violence in society." They use the pronouns she/they.

Sumerau's work has twice been a finalist for the Lambda Literary Award for Bisexual Fiction.

== Education and career ==
Sumerau received a Bachelor of Arts in Political Science from Augusta State University, as well as a Master of Science and Doctor of Philosophy in Sociology from Florida State University.

Aside from writing, Sumerau is the editor of the Society for the Study of Symbolic Interaction Music Blog. She also works at the University of Tampa where she serves as an Associate Professor of Sociology and the Director of Applied Sociology.

== Selected awards ==
Awards for J. E. Sumerau's written works
Year	Work	Award	Result
2018	Homecoming Queens	Lambda Literary Award in Bisexual Fiction	Finalist
2019	Other People's Oysters	Bisexual Book Awards in Mystery	Finalist
2019	Palmetto Rose	Bisexual Book Awards in Teen/Young Adult Fiction	Finalist
2019	Palmetto Rose	Lambda Literary Award in Bisexual Fiction	Finalist

== Publications ==
=== Fiction ===
- Cigarettes & Wine (2017)
- Homecoming Queens (2017)
- Other People’s Oysters, with Alexandra C.H. Nowakowski (2018)
- Palmetto Rose (2018)
- Via Chicago (2020)

==== Queering the Dixie ====
- Essence (2017)
- That Year (2017)

=== Nonfiction ===
- Negotiating the Emotional Challenges of Conducting Deeply Personal Research in Health, edited with Alexandra C.H. Nowakowski (2017)
- Christianity and the Limits of Minority Acceptance in America: God Loves (Almost) Everyone, with Ryan T. Cragun (2018)
- America Through Transgender Eyes, with Lain A.B. Mathers (2019)
- Expanding the Rainbow: Exploring the Relationships of Bi+, Polyamorous, Kinky, Ace, Intersex, and Trans People, edited with Brandy L. Simula and Andrea Miller (2019)
- Black Lives and Bathrooms: Racial and Gendered Reactions to Minority Rights Movements (2020)
- Transformations in Queer, Trans, and Intersex Health and Aging, with Alexandra C.H. Nowakowski and Nik M. Lampe (2020)
- Violent Manhood (2020)
