= Sugawara Akitada =

- First appearance: Instruments of Murder
- Created by: I. J. Parker

In-universe information
- Gender: Male
- Occupation: Civil servant
- Nationality: Japanese

Sugawara Akitada (菅原 顕忠) is a fictional character and a hero in a series of historical detective/mystery short stories and novels written by I. J. Parker, set in the Heian period of ancient Japan.

== Introduction ==
The character lived in 11th-century Japan, and came from a family of scholar-officials. It was revealed through short stories and novels that he was trained in orthodox (Confucianist) education, followed his family's tradition of entering the university, and graduated first in the final year, having specialised in law. His family suffered financially when prior to the completion of his education, his father died.

In the stories, Sugawara Akitada entered the civil service as a junior clerk in the Ministry of Law, with an income barely able to support his family: his mother who was shown as always being inexplicably hostile to him (the reason not revealed until the novel Hell Screen), two younger sisters and a small staff of family retainers.

As according to the era, the character was shown to be under immense pressure for the great responsibility to ensure his sisters married well - the only promising path for women of the era. Finding successful 'good' match would depend on the level of prestige of the family (as reflected through social status, wealth and rank), and the dowry he could offer.

The character's inquisitive mind and strong sense of justice got him involved in a variety of difficult cases, which he was usually able to solve, some in his personal capacity, some in the capacity of his job.

The main frustrations faced though was that his stubborn nature was not appreciated in a society, especially within the bureaucracy, which prized orthodoxy, conformity (to hierarchy), stability and unquestioning obedience to figures of authority. In the stories, Akitada was constantly reprimanded and even dismissed several times by his superiors.

To balance the odds, the author gave him allies in the form of several influential personages in the Imperial Court who respected and supported him, and appreciated his integrity.

== List of appearances in publications ==
According to the author herself, "The writing of the first Akitada novels actually predates the stories by more than a decade, but it was to be the stories that brought the novels into print."

=== Short stories ===
The following is a list of stories, in chronological order of publication in Alfred Hitchcock's Mystery Magazine, that feature Sugawara Akitada:

1. Instruments of Murder (October 1997).
2. The Curio Dealer's Wife (November 1997).
3. A Master of Go (December 1998).
4. Akitada's First Case (July/August 1999). Winner of Private Eye Writers of America Shamus Award for Best P.I. Short Story in 2000.
5. Rain at Rashomon (January 2000).
6. The New Year's Gift (April 2001).
7. Welcoming the Paddy God (December 2001).
8. Death and Cherry Blossoms (June 2002).
9. The O-Bon Cat (February 2003).
10. The Kamo Horse (October 2003).
11. The Tanabata Magpie (September 2005).
12. Moon Cakes (January/February 2007).
13. The Incense Murders (September 2009).
14. The Water Sprite (September 2011).
15. Fox Magic (September 2011).
16. Confessions (November 2012).

In November 2011, eleven of these short stories were arranged chronologically within-universe and packaged in a volume titled Akitada and the Way of Justice:

1. Akitada's First Case
2. The Incense Murders
3. Rain at Rashomon
4. Instruments of Murder
5. The Curio Dealer's Wife
6. The Master of Go
7. The New Year's Gift
8. The O-Bon Cat
9. Moon Cakes
10. The Tanabata Magpie
11. Welcoming the Paddy God

The Kamo Horse was republished as part of a collection raising money for the 2011 Japan Relief Fund administered by the Japan America Society of Southern California.

In February 2012, three of the short stories--Death and Cherry Blossoms, The Incense Murders, and Instruments of Murder—were packaged and republished in a volume called "Three Tales of Love and Murder."

In May 2012, three of the short stories--The New Year's Gift, The O-Bon Cat, and The Tanabata Magpie—were packaged and republished in a volume called "Akitada's Holiday."

=== Novels ===
The following is a list of full-length novels featuring Sugawara Akidata:

1. Dragon Scroll (July 2005, Penguin, ISBN 978-0-14-303532-9)
2. Rashomon Gate (July 2002, St. Martin's Press)
3. Black Arrow (December 2006, Penguin, ISBN 0-14-303561-4)
4. Island of Exiles (October 2007, Penguin, ISBN 978-0-14-311259-4)
5. The Hell Screen (September 2003, St. Martin's Press)
6. The Convict's Sword (July 2009, Penguin, ISBN 978-0-14-311579-3)
7. The Masuda Affair (December 2010, Severn House, ISBN 978-0-7278-6925-8)
8. The Fires of the Gods (April 2011, Severn House, ISBN 978-0-7278-6989-0)
9. Death on an Autumn River (November 2011, Virginia Beach, ISBN 978-1-4910-9363-4)
10. The Emperor's Woman (September 2013, Virginia Beach, ISBN 978-1-4922-6013-4)
11. Death of a Doll Maker (October 2013, Virginia Beach, Va. : I-J-P Books, ISBN 978-1-4927-6503-5)
12. The Crane Pavilion (January 2014, Virginia Beach, VA : I-J-P Books, ISBN 978-1-4949-3555-9)
13. The Old Men of Omi (August 2014, CreateSpace Independent Publishing Platform, ISBN 978-1-5008-5195-8)
14. The Shrine Virgin (January 2015, CreateSpace Independent Publishing Platform, ISBN 978-1-5059-9015-7)
15. The Assassin's Daughter (June 2015, CreateSpace Independent Publishing Platform, ISBN 978-1-5146-3559-9)
16. The Island of the Gods (December 2015, CreateSpace Independent Publishing Platform, ISBN 978-1-5227-3736-0)
17. Ikiryo: Vengeance and Justice (July 2017, CreateSpace Independent Publishing Platform, ISBN 978-1973833031)
18. The Kindness of Dragons (July 2018, CreateSpace Independent Publishing Platform, ISBN 978-1724666789)
19. The Nuns of Nara (May 2019, CreateSpace Independent Publishing Platform, ISBN 978-1096283799)
20. Massacre at Shirakawa (June 2020, CreateSpace Independent Publishing Platform, ISBN 979-8664376968)
21. The Lucky Gods of Otsu (2021)
22. The Temple of the Dead (2022)
23. Spring Festival in Akaiwa (2023)

The initial publisher (St. Martin's Press) decided to publish the novels in a different order from the internal chronological order of the novels.

In 2004, the author switched publisher to Penguin Group with the agreement to publish the novels according to internal chronology.

After publication of "The Fires of the Gods" in 2011, the author could not find a publisher who would publish the novel in print and released the stories only in Kindle. This continued until 2013 when the author decided to go into self-publishing for the rest of her novels in this series.

As of 2008, Books on Tape has signed to produce the above titles as an audiobook series, being read by actor Roy Vongtama.
