= Julia Ember =

American novelist

- Education: University of St. Andrews, Colby College (BA, MLitt)
- Writing career
- Years active: 2016-now
- Genre: young adult
- Notable work: The Seafarer's Kiss
- Website: julia-ember.com

Julia Ember is an author of young adult fantasy fiction, best known for her Young Adult retellings of classic works.

== Works ==
Ember's first novel, The Seafarer's Kiss, first in the Seafarer Duology, is a Norse retelling of The Little Mermaid, about a rebellious bisexual mermaid Ersel who falls for the shieldmaiden Ragna and makes a deal with the trickster god Loki to escape her fate as the bride of a merman she doesn't love. It was published in 2017 by Duet Books. The Seafarer's Kiss was a finalist for the 2017 Bisexual Book Award in the category Speculative Fiction. The companion novel, The Navigator's Touch, is a Norse retelling of Peter Pan and tells the story of the shieldmaiden Ragna, who is on a quest to avenger her destroyed home, with the help of a motley group of mercenaries and her mermaid girlfriend Ersel. It was published in 2018 by Duet Books.

Ember's next novel, Ruinsong, a fantasy retelling of the Phantom of the Opera, about a girl with a magic voice who is forced to use it to serve the queen, was published by Farrar, Straus & Giroux in November 2020.

Ember is also the author of several novellas and short stories. Unicorn Tracks, was published in 2016 by Harmony Ink Press. In the Tanzanian-inspired novella, a safari guide who tracks mythical creatures is employed by a researcher and his daughter to track unicorns, only to stumble upon a group of poachers they aim to stop from killing more unicorns.

Her second novella, The Tiger's Watch, is about a genderfluid spy with a magical bond to a tiger who seeks refuge in a monastery when their homeland gets invaded. It was published in 2017 by Harmony Ink Press.

== Bibliography ==
Novels

Seafarer Duology

1. The Seafarer's Kiss (Duet Books, 2017)
2. The Navigator's Touch (Duet Books, 2018)

Ruinsong (Farrar, Straus & Giroux, 2020)

Novellas

- Unicorn Tracks (Harmony Ink Press, 2016)
- The Tiger's Watch (Harmony Ink Press, 2017)

Short stories

- "The Herbalist" (The Hanging Garden, 2018)

== Awards ==
Nominations

2017

- Bisexual Book Award finalist in the category Speculative Fiction for The Seafarer's Kiss (Duet Books, 2017)
