= Deposing Nathan =

American fiction book published 2019

- Author: Zach Smedley
- Language: English
- Genre: Young adult fiction
- Published: 2019
- Publisher: Page Street
- Publication place: United States
- ISBN: 978-1624147357

Deposing Nathan is a 2019 young adult fiction book by American author Zack Smedley (born 1995).

== Book ==
Deposing Nathan was published by Page Street in May 2019. It tells the story of two teen boys who become best friends but eventually have a deadly falling-out, resulting in one of them being deposed and made to tell the story of what happened between them. Smedley conducted extensive research on the book's wide variety of subjects, including spending nearly six months studying law and completing several medical courses at his university.

== Reviews ==
Deposing Nathan earned a starred review from Kirkus Magazine and was praised by the New York Times as "a superb story, told in an original and masterly way." School Library Journal also reviewed the book favorably, writing, "At its heart a story about complex relationships, the structure adds layers of suspense that will have readers constantly reevaluating events." The book was included on several year-end lists, including Kirkus's Best YA Books of 2019 and ALA's 2020 Rainbow List. It was a finalist for a Lambda Literary Award and was the winner of the 2019 YA Bisexual Book Award.

== Author ==
Smedley was born in 1995 in Southern Maryland and attended the University of Maryland, Baltimore County, where he earned a degree in chemical engineering. He wrote his first full manuscript in eighth grade and began querying it at the end of his junior year of high school, to which it was "rejected unanimously." Smedley cycled through several more projects before writing what would become his debut novel, Deposing Nathan, during his senior year of college.

He is openly bisexual.

Smedley's sophomore novel, Tonight We Rule the World, is scheduled to be published in Fall 2021.

== Accolades ==
Won

- 2019 YA Bisexual Book Award for Deposing Nathan (Page Street, 2019)

Nominated

- 2020 Lambda Literary Award for Deposing Nathan (Page Street, 2019)
