= Basil Papademos =

Canadian writer (born 1957)

- Born: September 29, 1957; Toronto, Ontario
- Died: May 16, 2020; Toronto, Ontario
- Occupation: Novelist
- Writing career
- Period: 1989 - 2020
- Notable work: Mount Royal

Basil Papademos (born 1957 in Toronto, Ontario) was a Canadian writer. He is best known for his 2012 novel Mount Royal, which won the award for Best Erotic Novel at the 2013 Bisexual Book Awards and was a nominee in the novels category at the 2013 ReLit Awards.

After his Bisexual Book Awards win, he was detained by the Canada Border Services Agency for several hours upon his return to Canada, under suspicion of importing obscene materials. He was later cleared without charges.

He has also published the novels The Hook of It Is (1989) and How to Fuck Your Psychiatrist (2015).
