= Island of Exiles =

2007 detective novel by I. J. Parker

- Front cover of novel
- Author: I. J. Parker
- Language: English
- Genre: History, mystery
- Publisher: Penguin Group
- Publication date: 2007
- Publication place: Japan
- English publication date: 2007
- Media type: paperback
- Pages: 398
- ISBN: 978-0-14-311259-4
- OCLC: 86172963
- Dewey Decimal: 813/.6 22
- LC Class: PS3616.A745 I85 2007
- Preceded by: Black Arrow (internal chronology)
- Followed by: The Hell Screen (internal chronology)

Island of Exiles is a 2007 detective novel by I. J. Parker. The story follows Sugawara Akitada, who is assigned by two shadowy officials to investigate the fatal poisoning on penal colony on Sado Island of the exiled and disgraced Prince Okisada. The suspect is the son of the local governor, the officials thought he might have been framed as part of a treasonous plot. Akitada is forced to carry out an undercover investigation, taking on the guise of a convict sentenced to exile on the island. It becomes a perilous task, as the convicts on the island were treated "cheaper than dirt", expendable slaves to work the mines.

== Locations covered in the novel ==
- Sadoshima (佐渡島) : Sado Island in the Sea of Japan
- Sawata (佐和田) : A town on Sawata Bay (佐和田湾).
- Mano (真野) : Main port city and provincial capital on Sawata Bay.
- Minato : Village between Lake Kamo (加茂湖, Kamo Ko) and the northeast coast (modern Ryotsu).
- Tsukahara (塚原) : Village by the Ogura River near the southern mountains, where Prince Okisada had his residence.
- Temple of the True Lotus : A Buddhist temple and monastery a mile up the mountain from Tsukahara.
- Echigo Province : Northern province of Japan, located in modern Niigata. Known as "snow country".

== Dramatis Personae ==
- Prince Okisada - an older brother of the current emperor. He was exiled after failing to overthrow the incumbent ruler.
- Taira Takamune - devoted tutor of Prince Okisada who followed him into exile.
- Professor Sakamoto - retired professor of classics. He moved to Sado Island to write its history.
- Mutobe Toshikata - Governor of Sado Island.
- Mutobe Toshito - Son of the governor.
- Shunsei - A young Buddhist monk at the monastery of Temple of the True Lotus, and a lover of the prince.
- Yoshimine Taketsuna - New exile arrival at Sado.
- Jisei : Prisoner released from digging "badger holes".
- Haseo : Taciturn prisoner with a scarred back. Not originally from the lower classes.
- Ogata : Alcoholic physician and coroner.
- Wada : Local police authority.
- Yamada : Superintendent of the prison and "Valuables Office".
- Masako : Yamada's daughter, childhood beau of Toshito.
- Shijo Yukata : Head of the provincial archives.
- Genzo : A scribe at the archives.
- Ribata : A mysterious nun with a secret past.
- Osawa : Tax inspector.
- Kumo Sanetomo : Local landowner and appointed high constable of Sado island.
- Kita : Kumo's mine foreman.
- Takao : Landlady of Minato Inn who got Osawa's attention.
- Haru : Owner of lake restaurant named Bamboo Grove, famous for dishes from fresh catches by her husband.
- Nakatomi : Prince's physician.
- Taimai : Crippled porter.
- Oyoshi : Sister of Taimai, hostel keeper and mother of many children.
- Little Flower : Prostitute with stunted growth.
- Ikugoro : Wada's sergeant of constables.
