= Catherine Lundoff =

American writer, editor, and publisher

- Born: 30 March 1963; Brooklyn, New York, USA
- Website: https://catherinelundoff.net/

Catherine Lundoff (pen name, Emily L. Byrne; born 30 March 1963), is an American writer, editor, and publisher.

== Biography ==
Catherine Lundoff was born in Brooklyn, New York but currently lives in Minneapolis with her wife. Lundoff worked as an archeologist as well as a bookstore owner; her bookstore was "Grassroots Books" in Iowa City. She changed career and began to work in IT as a Data Engineer as well as becoming a writer. Lundoff is also an LGBT activist. Many of her papers are kept in the archival library of the University of Minnesota. As a writer, she has over a hundred published short stories and essays as well as eight books. Lundoff has worked as an editor on three anthologies and is the publisher at Queen of Swords Press. Lundoff also writes in the name "Emily L. Byrne". Lundoff has won a number of awards including a Gaylactic Spectrum Award, two Goldie Awards and a Rainbow Award for Speculative Fiction. In 2025, Lundoff won the coveted Alice B Readers Award given annually to living writers whose careers are distinguished by consistently well-written works about lesbians.

== Bibliography ==
- Silver Moon (2012)
- Blood Moon (2021)

=== Collections ===
- A Day at the Inn, a Night at the Palace and Other Stories (2011)
- Out of This World: Queer Speculative Fiction Stories (2017)
- Unfinished Business: Tales of the Dark Fantastic (2019)

=== Anthologies ===
- Haunted Hearths & Sapphic Shades: Lesbian Ghost Stories (2008)
- Hellebore & Rue (2011) with JoSelle Vanderhooft
- Scourge of the Seas of Time (and Space) (2018)

=== Short fiction ===
- M. Le Maupin (1997)
- El Tigre (1997)
- She Who Waits (2000)
- Vadija (2000)
- Regency Masquerade (2002)
- The Permanent (2004)
- Red Scare (2004)
- At the Roots of the World Tree (2005)
- Beauty (2006)
- The Snake Woman's Lover (2006)
- A Scent of Roses (2007)
- Twilight (2007)
- A Winter's Tale (2007)
- Spell, Book, and Candle (2008)
- Diplomacy (2008)
- Great Reckonings, Little Rooms (2009)
- The Egyptian Cat (2010)
- The Letter of Marque (2010)
- At Mother Laurie's House of Bliss (2011)
- A Day at the Inn, a Night at the Palace (2011)
- Silver Moon (excerpt) (2012)
- Medium Méchanique (2013)
- The Light Fantastic (2013)
- A Splash of Crimson (2017)
- The Mask and the Amontillado (2018)
