= Maria Pallotta-Chiarolli =

Australian gender and sexuality researcher

Maria Pallotta-Chiarolli AM is an Australian academic, author and activist specializing in the study of gender, sexuality and intersectionality. Pallotta-Chiarolli is an Honorary Fellow at Deakin University, and a member of its Gender and Sexuality Studies Network and LGBTIQ+ Network, researching in gender diversity, cultural diversity, family diversity and sexual diversity. She is also the author of Australia's first AIDS biography.

== Awards and recognition ==
- Two Lambda Literary Awards (GLBTIQ) and 2 Bisexual Book Awards in the USA.
- Founding member of the Australian LGBTIQ+ Multicultural Council in 2004.
- 2001 Australian Book Design Award in the Educational Texts for Young People Category for Boys Stuff, and listed in the Australian Centre for Youth Literature's “150 Years,150 Books: Victoria's Most Treasured Books” list.
- 2018, Victorian Globe Straight Ally Award.
- 2021, the national annual Maria Pallotta-Chiarolli Writers' Fellowship was established in the WA Writers Centre.
- 2022 Australia Day Honours appointed a Member of the Order of Australia for "significant service to the LGBTIQ community, and to education".

== Books ==
- Someone You Know: A Friend's Farewell, Adelaide: Wakefield Press, 1991. (new edition, 2002)
- Girls Talk: Young Women Speak Their Hearts and Minds, Lane Cove, Sydney: Finch Publishing, 1998.
- Tapestry: Italian Lives Over Five Generations, Milson's Point, Sydney: Random House, 1999.
- Boys’ Stuff: Boys Talking About What Matters, co-edited with Wayne Martino Sydney: Allen & Unwin, 2001.
- So What's A Boy? : Addressing Issues of Masculinity in Education with co-author Wayne Martino, London: Open University Press, 2003
- When Our Children Come Out: how to support gay, lesbian, bisexual and transgendered young people Sydney: Finch Publishing, 2005.
- Being Normal Is the Only Way To Be: Adolescent Perspectives on Gender and School, co-written with Wayne Martino, University of New South Wales Press, 2005.
- Love You Two, Sydney: Random House, 2008.
- Border Sexualities, Border Families in Schools, New York: Rowman & Littlefield, 2010.
- The Politics of Recognition and Social Justice: Transforming Subjectivities and New Forms of Resistance co-edited with Bob Pease, Routledge, 2014.
- Queerying Families of Origin co-edited with Chiara Bertone; Taylor & Francis Books, Oxfordshire, 2015
- Bisexuality in Education: Erasure, Exclusion by Inclusion, and the Absence of Intersectionality; (edited) London: Routledge, 2015
- Women in Relationships with Bisexual Men: Bi Men By Women. New York: Lexington Books, 2016.
- Living and Loving in Diversity: An Anthology of Australian Multicultural Queer Adventures. Adelaide: Wakefield Press, 2018.
