= Dreamspinner Press =

Publisher in Tallahassee, Florida

- Founded: 2007
- Country of origin: United States
- Headquarters location: Tallahassee, Florida
- Publication types: Books
- Fiction genres: gay romantic fiction
- Imprints: Harmony Ink Press
- Official website: www.dreamspinnerpress.com

Dreamspinner Press is a Tallahassee, Florida based LGBTQ publisher. Dreamspinner Press is an independent publisher, specializing in gay romantic fiction with print, eBook, and audiobook releases, and titles translated in French, German, Italian, Spanish, Japanese, Korean, Thai, Turkish and Hungarian. Titles include content in contemporary, historical, mystery and suspense, science fiction, fantasy and paranormal, steampunk, transgender, Western, and humor genres, along with the house branded lines. In March 2012, a GLBT teen and new adult fiction imprint, Harmony Ink Press, was launched for readers ages 14–21.

== Authors ==
- Victor J. Banis
- Rhys Ford
- Gayleen Froese
- J.L. Langley
- Kate McMurray
- Andrew Grey
- Damon Suede
- Tere Michaels
- Amy Lane
- Mary Calmes
- TA Moore
- C.S. Poe
- Bru Baker
- KC Wells
- Heidi Cullinan
- Parker Williams
- Tara Lain
- Victoria Sue
- Ari McKay
- Doug Lloyd

== Controversies ==
In 2019, authors began reporting that royalty payments due from Dreamspinner Press were late or missing. Author TJ Klune alleged that $27,000 was outstanding. It was later partially paid after Klune threatened legal action. In 2020, more authors have reported missing or reduced royalty payments. Later that same year, Dreamspinner Press retained a lawyer to oversee restructuring of the company, but maintained that they had no intention of filing for bankruptcy.

In August 2020, Dreamspinner Press was banned from the Romance Writers of America's Qualifying Markets list, due to a protracted period of failing to pay authors royalties.
