= C. B. Lee =

American author of young adult fiction

- Lee at Hugo Awards in 2026
- Writing career
- Language: English
- Years active: 2015-present
- Genre: Young adult fiction
- Notable works: Not Your Sidekick; Seven Tears at High Tide
- Notable awards: Rainbow Award 2015
- Website: cb-lee.com

C. B. Lee is an American author of young adult literature based in Los Angeles, California. They are best known for their Sidekick Squad series, which follows a quartet of teenagers in a near future world of superheroes and supervillains.

== Profile ==
Lee's parents are immigrants from Vietnam and China. Lee is bisexual and open about their struggles with mental illness. They have been featured in Teen Vogue, Hypable, and Wired Magazine for their novels. Lee is represented by Thao Le of the Sandra Dijkstra Literary Agency.

== Selected works ==
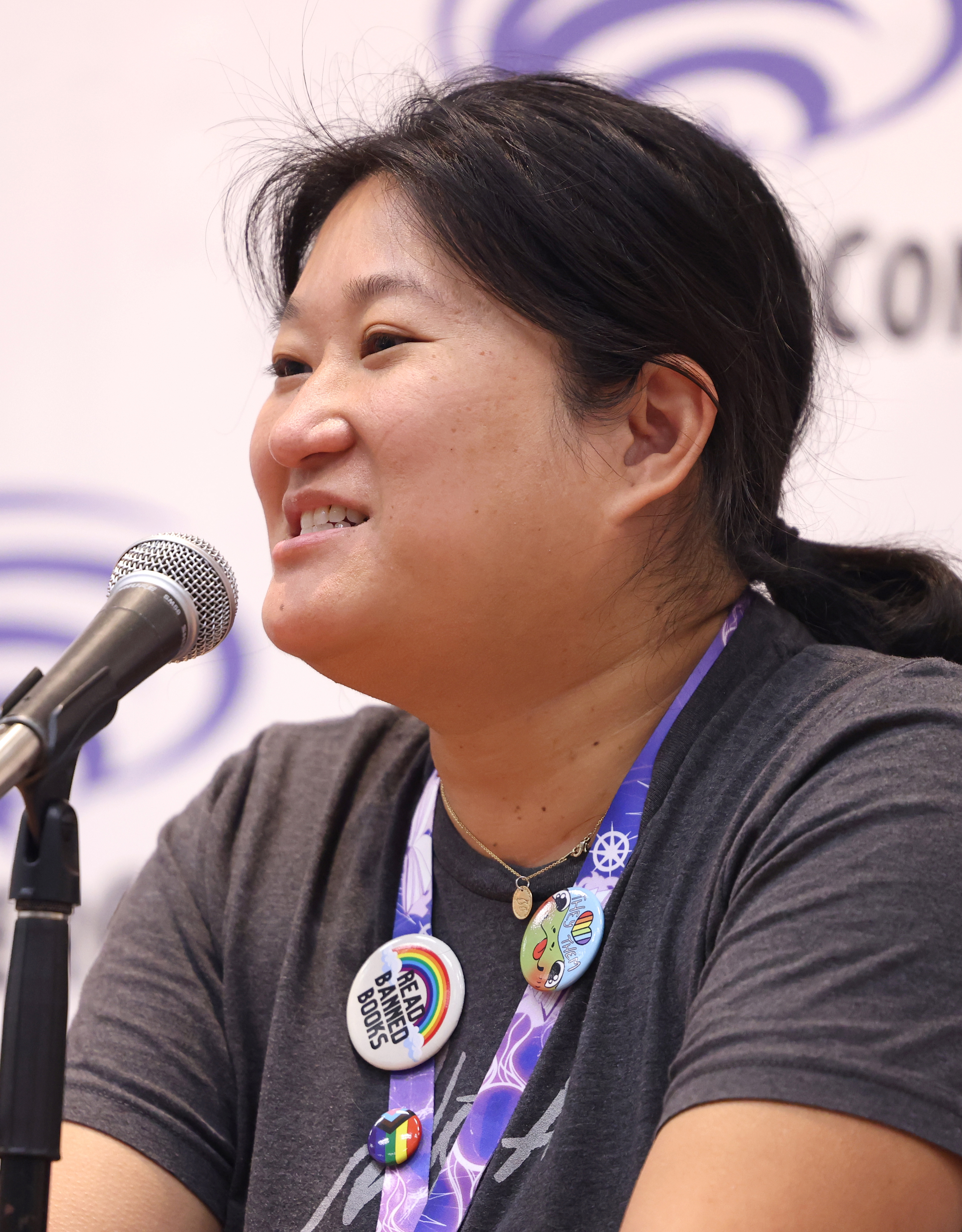
Lee in 2025

Their debut young adult novel, Seven Tears at High Tide, about a boy who gets rescued and falls for a selkie, was published by Duet Books in 2015. It won the 2016 Rainbow Award for Bisexual Fantasy & Fantasy Romance in 2016 and was a finalist for the 2016 Bisexual Book Award in the category Young Adult and Speculative Fiction.

The first book in the Sidekick Squad series, Not Your Sidekick, was published by Duet Books in 2016. It tells the story of Jess, a bisexual teen without superpowers living in a world where superpowers are normal, who has to compete with her town's infamous supervillain for her dream internship and deal with her crush on her friend Abby. Not Your Sidekick was a finalist for the 2017 Lambda Literary Award in the category LGBTQ Children's/Young Adult and a finalist for the 2017 Bisexual Book Award in Speculative Fiction. The second book, Not Your Villain, following the protagonists from the first novel who have now joined a resistance movement, was published by Duet Books in 2017. A third book, Not Your Backup, was published in 2019. Lee cites the X-Men and wanting to write a story incorporating identity and alienation as inspiration for writing the series.

Lee also contributed a short story to Saundra Mitchell's Out Now: Queer We Go Again!, published by Inkyard Press in 2020.

== Selected bibliography ==
=== Young Adult series ===
==== Sidekick Squad ====
- Not Your Sidekick (Duet Books, 2016, ISBN 978-1-945053-03-0)
- Not Your Villain (Duet Books, 2017)
- Not Your Backup (Duet Books, 2019)
- Not Your Hero (upcoming as of mid-2025)

=== Stand-alone young adult novels ===
- Seven Tears at High Tide (Duet Books, 2015)
- A Clash of Steel: A Treasure Island Remix (Macmillan, 2021)

== Awards ==
Year	Award	Category	Work	Result	Ref
2016	Rainbow Awards	Bisexual Fantasy & Fantasy Romance	Seven Tears at High Tide	Won	
	Bisexual Book Awards	Young Adult and Speculative Fiction	Seven Tears at High Tide	Nominated	
2017	Lambda Literary Awards	LGBTQ Children's/Young Adult	Not Your Sidekick	Nominated	
	Bisexual Book Awards	Speculative Fiction	Not Your Sidekick	Nominated	
2026	Lodestar Award		Coffeeshop in an Alternate Universe	Won	
