= Sibling Rivalry Press =

Small American publishing house

- Parent company: Sibling Rivalry Press (Independent Publisher)
- Status: Inactive
- Founded: 2010; 16 years ago
- Founder: Bryan Borland
- Country of origin: United States
- Headquarters location: Little Rock, Arkansas
- Nonfiction topics: Homosexuality
- Fiction genres: Poetry
- Official website: Sibling Rivalry Press

Sibling Rivalry Press is a small press publishing house based in Little Rock, Arkansas founded by Bryan Borland in 2010. It features both online and print components as well as the non-profit SRP Foundation, which financially supports the arts.

== History ==
Bryan Borland originally conceived of Sibling Rivalry Press as a vanity press through which to disseminate his collection of poetry, but decided to expand it to encompass other authors whose work focused on similar themes. Authors since published by Sibling Rivalry Press include Michael Klein, Dorothy Allison, Raymond Luczak, Bushra Rehman, and Stephen S. Mills.

The SRP website describes its purpose as catering to queer writers of poetry, albeit not exclusively.

=== Accolades ===
In 2012, Sibling Rivalry Press won the Bisexual Book Awards' Bi Book Publisher of the Year in a three-way tie with Lethe Press and Riptide Publishing.

In 2013, Sibling Rivalry's He Do the Gay Man in Different Voices, by Stephen S. Mills, won the Lambda Literary Award for Gay Poetry.

In 2014, The American Library Association honored nine "of SRP's titles...on its annual list of recommended LGBT reading".

In 2018, Sibling Rivalry's Prayers for my 17th Chromosome, by Amir Rabiyah, was a finalist for the Leslie Feinberg Award.
