= Daisy Hernández =

American writer and editor

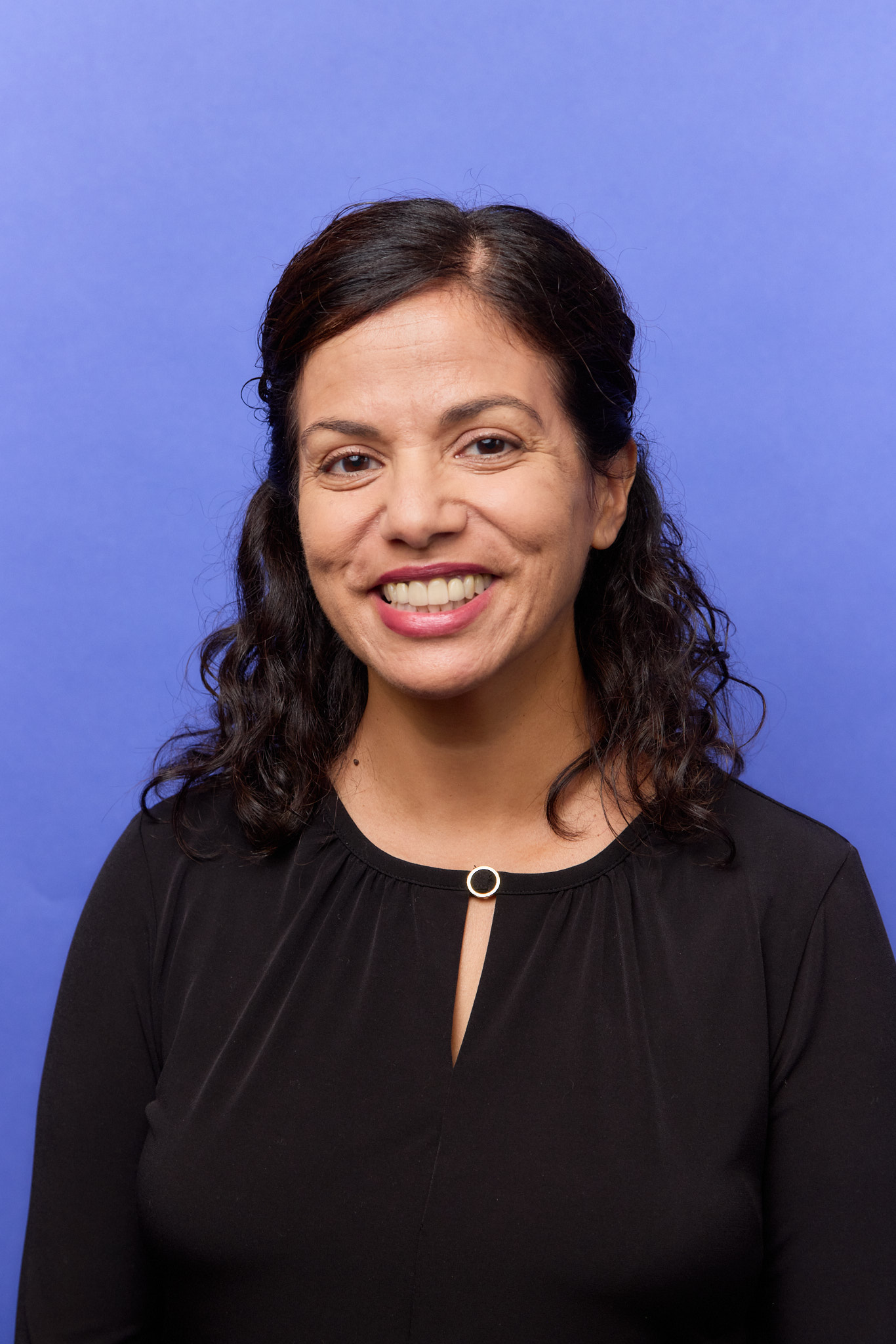
- Hernández in 2025
- Born: 1975
- Occupation: Writer/editor
- Writing career
- Language: English
- Website: www.daisyhernandez.com

Daisy Hernández is a writer and editor in the United States. She coedited the essay collection Colonize This! Young Women of Color on Today's Feminism (Seal Press, 2002), and in 2014 published A Cup of Water Under My Bed, a memoir about growing up queer in a Colombian-Cuban family. Hernández is an assistant professor at Northwestern University.

From 2008 to 2010, Hernández edited ColorLines, where she began working as a senior writer in 2004. On January 12, 2011, the NPR program All Things Considered broadcast her commentary on the 2011 Arizona shooting. Conservatives critiqued the piece for its use of the word gringo.

"Becoming a Black Man", her article about the experiences of black trans men, was nominated in 2009 for a GLAAD Media Award in the category of "Outstanding Magazine Article". In 2015, she was named one of the two winners of the Lambda Literary Foundation's "Betty Berzon Emerging Writer Award" at the 27th Lambda Literary Awards.

Hernández's 2021 book, The Kissing Bug, documents the prevalence of Chagas disease in the United States. In February 2022, The Kissing Bug was one of the three books selected for the inaugural version of Science + Literature program created by the National Book Foundation and the Alfred P. Sloan Foundation to highlight "diversity of voices in contemporary science and technology writing". She was a finalist at the 2021 New American Voices Award by the Institute for Immigration Research in US for her book - The Kissing Bug.

== Books ==
- 2002 Colonize This! Young Women of Color on Today's Feminism, Seal Press (co-edited with Bushra Rehman)
- 2014 A Cup of Water Under My Bed: A Memoir, Beacon Press
- 2021 The Kissing Bug: A True Story of a Family, an Insect, and a Nation's Neglect of a Deadly Disease, TinHouse
- 2026 Citizenship: Notes on an American Myth, Penguin Random House
