= Julie Cross =

American author of young adult fiction

Julie Cross is an American author of young adult fiction.

Cross is best known as the author of the Tempest Trilogy. The first book in the series, Tempest, was nominated for a 2012 Young Adult Fantasy/Futuristic/Science Fiction Novel Award from RT Book Reviews, and received a starred review from Kirkus Reviews

== Books ==
=== Tempest Trilogy ===
1. Tempest, St. Martin's Press, 2012
2. Vortex, St. Martin's Press, 2013
3. Timestorm, St. Martin's Press, 2014

=== Letters to Nowhere Series ===
1. Letters to Nowhere, Long Walk Press, 2013
2. Return to Sender, Long Walk Press, 2013
3. Return to You, Long Walk Press, 2013
4. Return to Us, Long Walk Press, 2014

=== Other books ===
- Third Degree, Flirt, 2014
- Whatever Life Throws at You, Entangled Teen, 2014
- Fifty First Times: A New Adult Anthology, Avon, 2014
