= I. J. Parker =

American novelist

- Born: January 1, 1936 (age 90); Munich

Ingrid J. Parker (born January 1, 1936) is an American detective/mystery writer. She is best known for creating Sugawara Akitada, who solved crimes in the Heian era of ancient Japan.

== Personal life ==
Ingrid Parker was born and raised in Germany.

She was, until retirement, Associate Professor of English and Foreign Languages at Norfolk State University in Virginia. Writing detective mysteries set in ancient Japan was an incidental result of initial research into 11th century Japan out of professional interest in Japanese literature of the era. She was also influenced by the Judge Dee mystery series written by the noted orientalist and diplomat Robert van Gulik.

== Bibliography ==
=== Sugawara Akitada ===
See Sugawara Akitada for a complete bibliography.

=== Other works ===
- The Hollow Reed vol. I: Dream of a Spring Night (September 2012, Ingrid J. Parker Inc.)
- The Hollow Reed vol. II: Dust Before the Wind (September 2012, Ingrid J. Parker Inc.,)
- The Sword Master (October 2013, 2nd edition, CreateSpace Independent Publishing Platform, ISBN 978-1493553549)
- The Left-Handed God (December 2013, CreateSpace Independent Publishing Platform, ISBN 978-1493782192)
