= Shira Glassman =

American writer

- Occupation: Author
- Writing career
- Genre: Fantasy fiction
- Notable work: Mangoverse

Shira Glassman is an American author of fantasy fiction. She is best known for creating the Mangoverse, a series of queer fantasy novels beginning with The Second Mango in 2013.

== Early and personal life ==
Shira Glassman lives in north-central Florida. She identifies as Jewish and bisexual. She has cited German and French opera, as well as the detective fiction of Agatha Christie, among her influences.

== Literary career ==
Glassman began writing fantasy fiction in the early 2010s. Her debut novel, The Second Mango, was published in 2013 and introduced the fictional tropical kingdom of Perach, the setting for the Mangoverse series. Subsequent installments in the series included Climbing the Date Palm (2014), A Harvest of Ripe Figs (2015), The Olive Conspiracy (2016), and the short-story collection Tales from Perach (2017).

The story centers on Queen Shulamit, who is a lesbian, and other recurring characters including Shulamit's friend Rivka, Rivka's dragon boyfriend Isaac, and cook Aviva, who is a bisexual. Shulamit seeks Riv's help to find her a companion after her previous relationship with Aviva ended while Riv herself is mourning the loss of her wizard friend Isaac. Kaveh is a prince who seeks Riv's help to find his lover Farzin. The books explore the relationships of these three couples, and the adventures of these characters.

Glassman's fiction explores themes of family, Jewish culture, and queer relationships. The Mangoverse series features several queer and Jewish characters. In interviews, Glassman has stated that she created the Mangoverse partly in response to a perceived lack of queer and Jewish representation in fantasy fiction. She has described her work as an attempt to create stories where LGBTQ and Jewish characters have a happy and innocent childhood, and can experience adventure, romance, and happy endings without being defined primarily by tragedy.

Glassman has also written the novels Knit One, Girl Two and Gifts of Spring.

== Awards and honors ==
Several of her books have been nominated for the Bisexual Book Awards and the Golden Crown Literary Society Awards.
