= Mykola Dementiuk =

American author

- Born: 1949 (age 76–77)
- Education: Columbia University
- Occupation: Author
- Writing career
- Notable awards: Lambda Literary Award for Bisexual Literature (2010)

Mykola Dementiuk (born 1949) is an American author. A graduate of Columbia University, his work has appeared in Pink Pages, Atom Mind, Paramour, and EIDOS Magazine. He was a member of the road crew for Lollapalooza, the Big Apple Circus, and Cirque du Soleil before being partially incapacitated by a stroke in 1997.

Dementiuk received a Lambda Literary Award in 2010 for his novel Holy Communion, and again in 2013 for The Facialist. His collection Times Square Queer: Tales of Bad Boys in the Big Apple was a finalist for the 2013 Bisexual Book Awards.

== Bibliography ==
- Vienna Dolorosa (2007)
- Holy Communion (2008)
- 100 Whores: Memories of a John (2010)
- Dee Dee Day (2010)
- Variety, the Spice of Life (2010)
- Kisser: A Masculine Femininity (2011)
- Queers of Central Park (2011)
- The Facialist (2012)
- Times Square Queer: Tales of Bad Boys in the Big Apple (2012)
- Sissy Godiva (2013)
- The Bookstore Clerk (2013)
