= Kate Evans =

British cartoonist, non-fiction author and graphic novelist

- Born: Kate Evans; 1972 (age 53–54) Montreal, Quebec, Canada
- Area: Cartoonist
- Notable works: Threads from the Refugee Crisis, Red Rosa

Kate Evans (born 1972) is a British cartoonist, non-fiction author and graphic novelist.

== Biography ==
Kate Evans was born in Montreal, Canada, and raised in Surrey, England. She studied English literature at the University of Sussex in Brighton where she became involved in political opposition to the Criminal Justice and Public Order Act 1994. Here she became associated with the SchNEWS DIY activist publication, editing and contributing artwork to several of its annual editions. From 1995 to 1998 Evans dedicated herself to environmental activism, providing cartoon reportage from a tree house on the route of the Newbury Bypass for The Guardian newspaper. In 1998, Evans wrote, illustrated and published her account as Copse: the Cartoon Book of Tree Protesting.

Since 2000, Evans has produced a series of non-fiction graphic works on a variety of social and political topics. The Food of Love: your formula for successful breastfeeding has popularised attachment parenting techniques. Evans subsequently authored and illustrated the pregnancy and birth manual Bump: how to make, grow and birth a baby.

Red Rosa: a graphic biography of Rosa Luxemburg, an account of the life and work of revolutionary socialist Rosa Luxemburg was shortlisted for the Bread and Roses Award 2016.

Evans returned to comics journalism with the book Threads from the Refugee Crisis, reportage from the Calais Jungle. Threads from the Refugee Crisis was awarded the John C. Laurence Award from the Society of Authors in 2016 and won the Broken Frontier Award for Graphic Non Fiction 2017. In 2018 it became the first graphic novel to be nominated for the Orwell Prize for Books.

Evans lives in Somerset, UK, with her spouse and two children.

== Publications ==
- Copse: the Cartoon Book of Tree Protesting. Self-published, 1998. ISBN 978-0953267408. With photographs by Adrian Arbib, Gideon Mendel, and Andrew Testa.
- Funny Weather: Everything you Didn't Want to Know About Climate Change but Probably Should Find Out. Brighton: Myriad, 2006. ISBN 978-0-954930-93-6. With an introduction by George Monbiot.
  - Weird Weather. Groundwood, 2007. Canada and USA edition. ISBN 978-0888998385. With an introduction by Monbiot.
  - Il clima furioso. Tutto quello che dovete sapere sui cambiamenti climatici. Italy: LIT - Libri in Tasca, 2013. ISBN 978-8865831366.
- The Food of Love: your formula for successful breastfeeding. Brighton: Myriad, 2009. ISBN 978-0954930950.
- Bump: how to make, grow and birth a baby. Brighton: Myriad, 2014. ISBN 978-1-908434-35-7.
- Red Rosa: a Graphic Biography of Rosa Luxemburg. Verso, 2015. ISBN 9781784780999.
- Threads from the Refugee Crisis. Verso, 2017. ISBN 9781786631732.
- Don't Call Me Princess!. New Internationalist, 2018. ISBN 9781780264653.
- Patchwork: A Graphic Biography of Jane Austen. Verso, 2025. ISBN 9781804296226.
