= Molly Wizenberg =

American chef, entrepreneur and writer

Molly Wizenberg is an American chef, entrepreneur, and writer. She is the author of a food blog, Orangette, which won a James Beard Award for food writing in 2015. She has also written a memoir, The Fixed Stars, which won a Stonewall Book Award in 2021, and her previous recipe book/memoir, titled A Homemade Life, was a New York Times bestseller.

== Career ==
Wizenberg began her career studying anthropology, but did not complete her Ph.D. In 2004, she started a food blog, Orangette. In 2015, she won the James Beard Foundation Award for best individual blog (for Orangette). Wizenberg authored a book, titled A Homemade Life: Stories and Recipes from My Kitchen Table, which consisted of recipes and memoirs, and became a New York Times best-seller. In 2009, Wizenberg co-founded a Seattle-based pizzeria named Delancey, with her (now ex) husband, Brandon Pettit. She also wrote a book, titled Delancey: A Man, A Woman, A Marriage, which was an account of establishing the pizzeria, as well as a personal memoir. Since 2010, Wizenberg has co-hosted a podcast about food titled Spilled Milk, with Matthew Amster-Burton.

== Personal life ==
Wizenberg met her former husband, Brandon Pettit, after he read her blog and contacted her about it. In 2016, Wizenburg published a post on her blog, coming out and writing that she was "not straight anymore." Wizenberg has since remarried, to Ash Wizenberg-Choi. She has written a memoir about her personal life, and relationships, titled The Fixed Stars, which won a Stonewall Book Award in 2021.

== Bibliography ==
- A Homemade Life: Stories and Recipes from My Kitchen Table (2010) ISBN 9781416551058
- Delancey: A Man, A Woman, A Restaurant, A Marriage (2015) ISBN 9781451655094
- The Fixed Stars (2021) ISBN 9781419742996
