= Hannah Moskowitz =

American young adult & middle grade author

- Born: Silver Spring, Maryland, U.S.
- Education: University of Maryland
- Writing career
- Years active: 2009–present
- Genres: Young adult fiction, middle grade fiction
- Notable works: Break; Gone Gone Gone; Sick Kids in Love
- Notable awards: 2013 Stonewall Book Award 2019 Sydney Taylor Honor Award
- Website: hannahmosk.blogspot.com

Hannah Moskowitz is an American author of young adult and middle grade novels. As of 2021, Moskowitz has published fourteen novels, three short stories, and three non-fiction essays.

== Career ==
Her first novel, Break, was published while she was a junior in high school. On the Jellicoe Road, When You Reach Me, The Year of Secret Assignments, and My Heartbeat are among Moskowitz's favorite books.

=== Young adult fiction ===
Moskowitz' debut young adult novel Break, about a boy on a mission to break every bone in his body, was published in 2009 by Simon Pulse. Break was on was on the ALA's 2010 list of Popular Paperbacks for Young Adults and received a starred review from Booklist.

Her sophomore novel, Invincible Summer, told over four summers dealing with the divorce of the main character's parents and summer romance, was published by Simon Pulse in 2011.

Her third novel, Gone, Gone, Gone, set one year after 9/11, was published in 2012 by Simon Pulse. It was a Stonewall Honor Book for 2013.

Moskowitz' fourth novel, Teeth, about a teen moving to a remote island and befriending two mysterious teens with dark secrets, was published by Simon Pulse in 2013. It received a starred review from Kirkus Reviews and Booklist.

Her fifth novel, Not Otherwise Specified, was published by Simon Pulse in 2015. It tells the story of black bisexual ex-ballerina Etta, who struggles with fitting in and applies to a New York art school.

Her sixth novel, A History of Glitter and Blood, was published by Chronicle in 2016. It follows rebellious fairy Beckan, who gets mixed up in a war between fairies, gnomes, and "tightropers", a mysterious fantasy people who invade the city walking on tightropes in the sky. It received a starred review from Bulletin of the Center for Children's Books.

Moskowitz also co-wrote a novel with Kat Helgeson, Gena/Finn, about two teen girls who bond over their intense appreciation for a cop TV show and ultimately fall in love over the course of a series of online interactions. The story is a modern example of the epistolary novel, as the narrative unfolds through a series of fanfics, art pieces, text messages, and emails between and about the characters. It was published in 2016 by Chronicle.

Moskowitz self-published her next two novels, 3 and Wild, via Amazon.

Her tenth novel, Salt, about a family of teenage sea monster hunters, was published by Chronicle in 2018. Salt received a starred review from Kirkus Reviews.

Her next novel, Sick Kids in Love, about two chronically ill teens who fall in love after meeting at the hospital, was published by Entangled Teen in November 2019. It received a starred review from Kirkus Reviews, Booklist, and Publishers Weekly. It was also a nominee for YALSA's Best Fiction for Young Adults and a recipient of the Sydney Taylor Honor Award.

=== Middle grade fiction ===
Her debut middle grade novel, Zombie Tag, about a boy who resurrects his late older brother as a zombie, was published by Roaring Brook in 2011. Her second middle grade, Marco Impossible, was published by Roaring Brook in 2013.

== Bibliography ==
=== Young adult ===
==== Novels ====
- Break (Simon Pulse, 2009)
- Invincible Summer (Simon Pulse, 2011)
- Gone, Gone, Gone (Simon Pulse, 2012)
- Teeth (Simon Pulse, 2013)
- Not Otherwise Specified (Simon Pulse, 2015)
- A History of Glitter and Blood (Chronicle, 2015)
- Gena/Finn, cowritten with Kat Helgeson (Chronicle, 2016)
- 3 (Amazon, 2016)
- Wild (Amazon, 2017)
- Salt (Chronicle, 2018)
- Sick Kids in Love (Entangled Teen, 2019)
- The Love Song of Ivy K. Harlowe (Entangled Teen, 2021)

==== Short stories ====
- in Violent Ends, edited by Shaun David Hutchinson (Simon Pulse, 2015)
- in It's a Whole Spiel, edited by Katherine Locke and Laura Silverman (Knopf, 2019)

=== Middle grade novels ===
- Zombie Tag (Roaring Brook Press, 2011)
- Marco Impossible (Roaring Brook Press, 2013)

=== New adult short story ===
- in Fifty First Times, edited by Julie Cross (Avon Impulse, 2014)

=== Non-fiction essays ===
- in Dear Teen Me: Authors Write Letters to Their Teen Selves, edited by E. Kristin Anderson (Zest Books, 2012)
- in Life Inside My Mind: 31 Authors Share Their Personal Struggles, edited by Jessica Burkhardt (Simon Pulse, 2018)
- in Our Stories, Our Voices: 21 YA Authors Get Real About Injustice, Empowerment, and Growing Up Female in America, edited by Amy Reed (Simon Pulse, 2018)

== Awards & honors ==
- 2010: American Library Association's Popular Paperbacks for Young Adults for Break (Simon Pulse, 2009)
- 2013: Stonewall Book Award for Gone, Gone, Gone (Simon Pulse, 2012)
- 2019: Sydney Taylor Honor Award for Sick Kids in Love (Entangled Teen, 2019)
