= Annette Lapointe =

Canadian writer (born 1978)

- Born: 1978 (age 47–48); Saskatoon, Saskatchewan, Canada
- Education: University of Saskatchewan; Memorial University of Newfoundland; University of Manitoba
- Writing career
- Language: English
- Notable work: Stolen (2006)

Annette Lapointe is a Canadian writer whose debut novel, Stolen, was a longlisted nominee for the Scotiabank Giller Prize in 2006. Born in 1978 in Saskatoon, Saskatchewan, she was educated at the University of Saskatchewan, Memorial University of Newfoundland and the University of Manitoba.

Stolen also received two honors from the Saskatchewan Book Awards: Best First Novel and the Saskatoon Book Award, and was nominated for the Books in Canada First Novel Award. Lapointe was also named Emerging Writer of 2007 by the Canadian Authors Association.

Her second novel, Whitetail Shooting Gallery, was published in 2013.

== Other ==
Annette Lapointe became a reviewer at New York Journal of Books in 2018.
