= Sarah Blake (poet) =

American writer (1984 - )

- Born: New Jersey, United States
- Occupations: Poet, novelist
- Children: 1
- Writing career
- Language: English
- Years active: 2006-
- Genres: Poetry, fiction
- Notable works: Naamah, Mr. West
- Website: sarahblakeauthor.com

Sarah Blake is an American writer from Philadelphia, Pennsylvania. Her debut novel, Naamah, is a retelling of the Great Flood and the family's time on the ark. Her poetry books include Mr. West and Let's Not Live on Earth, as well as the chapbook Named After Death. She received a Literature Fellowship from the NEA in 2013.

== Life ==
Blake grew up in New Jersey. She attended The College of New Jersey as an undergraduate majoring in math and minoring in creative writing. She later received her MA in creative writing at the University of Texas at Austin, and her MFA in poetry from Pennsylvania State University. She currently lives outside London.

== Career ==
Blake has worked for the Geraldine R. Dodge Foundation and Princeton Day School. She also co-created the website Submittrs, an online submission tracking tool for writers. In an editorial capacity, Blake has worked with Philadelphia publisher Saturnalia Books and MiPOesias.

The New York Times described Naamah as a "very wild and superbly intelligent reimagining" of the Biblical story and a "21st-century riff on climate disaster."

== Honors ==
- 2013 NEA Literature Fellowship
- 2019 National Jewish Book Award Winner, Goldberg Prize for Debut Fiction

== Published works ==
=== Poetry ===
- Mr. West (Wesleyan University Press, 2015) ISBN 978-0-819-57691-0
- Named After Death (Banango Editions, 2016)
- Let's Not Live on Earth (Wesleyan University Press, 2017) ISBN 978-0-819-57766-5
- In Springtime (Wesleyan University Press, 2023) ISBN 978-0819500304

=== Fiction ===
- Naamah (Riverhead Books, 2019) ISBN 978-0-525-53633-8
- Clean Air (Algonquin Books, 2022) ISBN 978-1-64375-106-1
