= Georgia Clark =

Australian writer

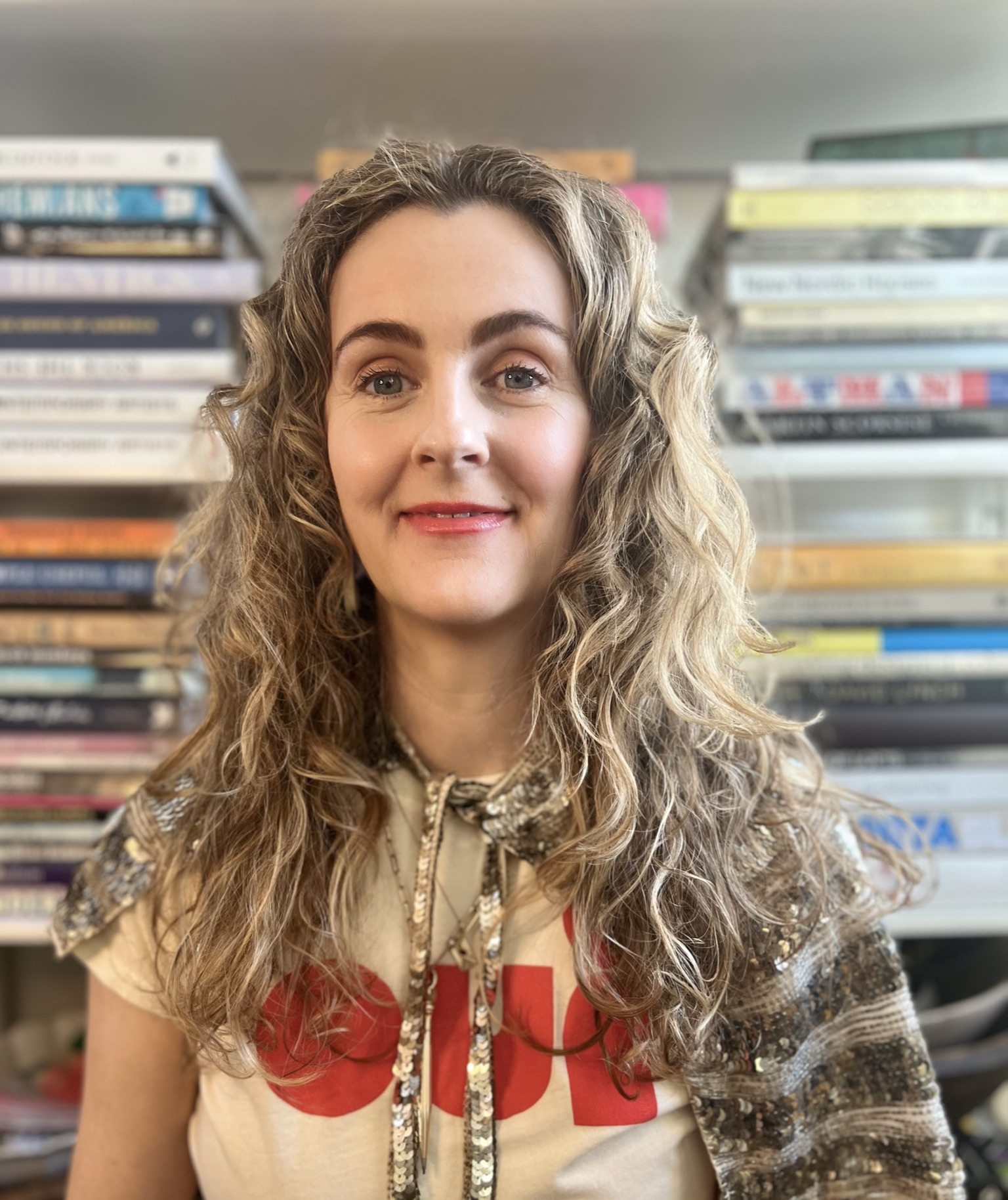
- Born: 1980 (age 45–46); Sydney, Australia
- Occupation: Writer
- Website: georgiaclark.com

Georgia Clark (born 1980) is an Australian-born writer based in New York. She is the founder of Generation Women, a monthly event series that takes place in New York, Montreal, and Sydney and Melbourne, Australia.

== Personal life ==
Clark was born in 1980 in Sydney, Australia. She was educated at Gosford High School.

Clark identifies as queer.

== Career ==
Early in her life, she was involved in Sydney's underground art scene, participating in filmmaking, screenwriting, and editing a music magazine. During this period, she formed a band that began as a fictional project but later became a real musical group. She also contributed to various publications, created zines, and published her first young adult novel, She's With The Band.

In 2009, at the age of 29, Clark moved to New York City and became involved in the improvisational comedy scene, particularly with the Upright Citizens Brigade (UCB), where she was on a house team. She transitioned from filmmaking to novel writing, finding the latter more creatively inspiring.

In 2017, Clark founded Generation Women, a monthly storytelling event that takes place in New York, Montreal, Sydney, and Melbourne. The series features women and non-binary performers, each from a different age group who perform original, true stories related to a shared theme. The idea for Generation Women arose from a conversation between Clark and her mother, where her mother shared that she'd begun to feel "invisible" as she aged. The discussion prompted Clark to create a platform for women and non-binary folk to share their experiences across generations.

Clark writes the monthly author newsletter, Heartbeat. She teaches the Romance Workshop and mentors Writers Group and Storyteller Groups. She hosts a Writers Retreat in Catskill, New York several times a year.

== Writing ==
Clark's second novel, Parched, was published in 2014. It was about a dystopian future Earth affected by extreme water scarcity. The story follows 16-year-old Tess as she joins a subversive group to uncover the secrets of the governing Trust and confront the ethical dilemmas of a world with diminishing resources. Kirkus' review called it "bold futurist adventure with unusual romance, riveting action and ominous ecological red flags."

In 2016, Clark wrote The Regulars. The novel explored the consequences of a group of friends using a potion called "Pretty" to become supermodel attractive. The story delved into themes of self-esteem, female sexuality, and the allure of physical beauty. It made Booklist's Top 10 Women's Fiction books of that year, who called it "raunchy, very funny... distinctly hip and modern." As well as the U.S., it was published in Canada, Australia, New Zealand, the U.K., Italy, Germany, Portugal and Brazil. It was reviewed by Kirkus as well.

In 2018, Clark authored The Bucket List. The novel was reviewed by Kirkus Reviews and Library Journal. It followed 25-year-old Lacey Whitman, who discovered she carried the BRCA1 gene mutation, putting her at high risk for breast cancer. Lacey created a "Boob Bucket List" to celebrate her body before considering a preventative mastectomy, exploring themes of women empowerment, sexuality, and self-care. The novel was positively reviewed by Kirkus, who called it, "a compelling, thoughtful take on a very real women's health issue; both confidently sexy and lighthearted at the same time", Library Journal, Book Reporter, and Bustle.

In her 2021 novel It Had to Be You, Clark explored the life of Liv Goldenhorn, who discovered her late husband had left his share of their wedding-planning company to his younger mistress, Savannah. The ensemble romantic comedy followed Liv, Savannah, and various characters in their orbit as they navigated love, relationships, and personal growth. It received a starred review from Booklist, who said it "reads like a love letter to New York-set rom coms. Full of immersive details, rich characters, and great banter, Clark's latest perfectly balances sweetness with an edge of realism that will draw readers in." The novel was also reviewed by Library Journal, Publishers Weekly and Kirkus Reviews.

In 2022, Clark wrote Island Time, an ensemble romantic comedy that centers a queer romance set on a secluded Australian island, where a stranded extended family navigated new romances and personal challenges in the aftermath of a volcanic eruption. Publishers Weekly called Island Time "[a] fun, steamy rom-com about finding love in unexpected places.... A feel-good sapphic love story ideal for armchair travelers".

== Bibliography ==
- She's With The Band (2008)
- Parched (2014)
- The Regulars (2016)
- The Bucket List (2018)
- It Had to Be You (2021)
- Island Time (2022)
- Most Wonderful (2024)
