= Jennifer Steil =

American author and journalist (born 1968)

Jennifer Florence Steil
- Born: November 18, 1968; Boston, Massachusetts, U.S.
- Died: September 20, 2026 (aged 57); Paris
- Education: Oberlin College
- Occupations: Author; journalist
- Spouse: Timothy Torlot (m. 2012)
- Children: 1

Jennifer Florence Steil (November 18, 1968 - September 20, 2026) was an American author and journalist.

== Books ==
Jennifer Steil was the author of The Woman Who Fell From the Sky, (Broadway Books 2010), a memoir about her tenure as the editor-in-chief of the Yemen Observer in Sanaa, Yemen.

The book received favorable reviews in The New York Times, Sydney Morning Herald, and Newsweek magazine as well as in other publications. National Geographic Traveler has included the book in its list of recommended reading. The Minneapolis Star Tribune chose it as a best travel book of the year in 2010, and Elle awarded it the magazine’s Readers’ Prize in August of that year. The Woman Who Fell From the Sky has been published in the US, New Zealand, Australia, Germany, the Netherlands, Poland, Italy, and Turkey.

Steil’s novel The Ambassador’s Wife was published by Doubleday on July 28, 2015. The book received the 2013 Best Novel award in the William Faulkner-William Wisdom Creative Writing Competition. The Ambassador's Wife was published in Italy and will be published in Bulgaria, Greece, and Poland.

Steil's novel Exile Music was published by Viking in 2020. Exile Music tells the story of a Jewish girl, Orly, whose family flees the Nazis, relocating from Vienna to the mountains of Bolivia.

Steil contributed to the book Not A Rose, CHARTA, Milan, New York, 2012. For this book, a hybrid work that is both book and conceptual art installation, she wrote an essay entitled “Roses After Rain.”

== Personal life ==
Steil was born in Boston and grew up in Groton, Massachusetts. She graduated from Oberlin College in 1990.

She was bisexual and married to Timothy Achille Torlot, the former British Ambassador to Uzbekistan.

After college, she spent four years working as an actor in Seattle before moving to New York City for graduate school.

Since 1997, she worked as a reporter, writer, and editor for newspapers and magazines in the US and abroad. In 2001, she helped to launch The Week magazine in the US, and worked there for five and a half years, writing the science, health, theatre, art, and travel pages.

Steil lived outside of the US after she moved to Yemen in 2006 to become the editor-in-chief of the Yemen Observer. After four years in Yemen, her husband Tim Torlot, then the UK Ambassador to Yemen, was attacked by a suicide bomber. Steil and their daughter Theadora Celeste were evacuated to Jordan, where they lived for four months while Torlot finished his posting. The family then moved to London, where Steil continued writing her second book, a novel, and worked as a freelance journalist. While there, her work included a long piece on Yemen for the World Policy Journal, a Yemen piece for the German paper Die Welt, and stories on Kate & Will’s royal wedding, London’s 9/11 monument, and British politics for the Washington Times. Steil gave talks and readings all over the world. Since 2010, she spoke in Algeria, New York, Seattle, Dubai, Amsterdam, The Hague, Egypt, Boston, Abu Dhabi, Vermont, and London.

Their daughter Theadora Celeste Steil Torlot was born in London on November 13, 2009.

She moved with her family to Bolivia in September 2012, to Uzbekistan in 2019, and then to France upon her husband's retirement. She died in Paris on September 20, 2026, after battling cancer, a fight which she recorded on her Substack, Liminal.
