= Cheryl B =

American writer and performance artist

- Cheryl B at the 2010 Lambda Literary Awards
- Born: Cheryl Burke; September 19, 1972; Staten Island, New York
- Died: June 18, 2011 (aged 38)
- Education: New York University, The New School
- Partner: Kelli Dunham
- Awards: 2013 Lambda Literary Award for Bisexual Literature

Cheryl Burke (September 19, 1972 – June 18, 2011), known professionally as Cheryl B, was an American journalist, spoken word poet, performance artist and playwright, associated with the East Village arts scene in New York City. She is best known for her autobiographical book My Awesome Place: The Autobiography of Cheryl B, which was published posthumously and was co-winner, with John Irving's novel In One Person, of the 2013 Lambda Literary Award for Bisexual Literature.

== Biography ==
Burke was born on September 19, 1972, in Staten Island, New York, and raised in New Jersey. She later moved to New York City, where she was a graduate of both New York University and The New School. During her lifetime, Burke was known for spoken word poetry performances at venues such as the Nuyorican Poets Café, Bowery Poetry Club, the National Arts Club, P.S. 122, and the St. Mark's Poetry Project. Her work appeared in periodicals such as Ping Pong, BUST, KGB Bar Lit, GO and Velvet Park, and in anthologies such as Word Warriors: 35 Women Leaders in the Spoken Word Revolution (Seal Press, 2007), Reactions 5 (Pen & Inc, 2005), The Milk of Almonds: Italian-American Women Writers on Food & Culture (Feminist Press, 2002), The World in Us (St. Martins Press, 2000), Pills, Thrills, Chills and Heartache (Alyson Books, 2004) and His Hands, His Tools, His Sex, His Dress (Haworth Press, 2001).

She was diagnosed with Hodgkin's lymphoma in 2010. She maintained a blog, WTF Cancer Diaries, to document her experiences with cancer treatment, but died on June 18, 2011, from bleomycin poisoning, a complication from her treatment. My Awesome Place, her sole published book, was finalized for publication by a group of her friends and colleagues, including writer Sarah Schulman, and was published by Topside Press in 2012.

An out bisexual, she was survived by her partner Kelli Dunham, who accepted the Lambda Literary Award for My Awesome Place on her behalf. In addition to the Lambda Literary Award, My Awesome Place also won the Bi Writer Award at the Bi Writers Association's inaugural Bisexual Book Awards in 2013.

== Works ==
- My Awesome Place: The Autobiography of Cheryl B (2012, ISBN 978-0983242253)
