= The Ambassador's Wife (Steil novel) =

Book by Jennifer Steil

- First edition
- Author: Jennifer Steil
- Language: English
- Genre: Fiction novel
- Published: July 28, 2015
- Publisher: Doubleday
- Publication place: United States
- Media type: Print, e-book, audiobook
- Pages: 400 pp.
- ISBN: 0385539029
- Preceded by: The Woman Who Fell From The Sky

The Ambassador's Wife is a 2015 novel by American author Jennifer Steil about the kidnapping of an American woman in the Middle East. The story was inspired by the author's personal experiences as the wife of the British Ambassador to Yemen.

The book received the 2013 Best Novel award in the William Faulkner-William Wisdom Creative Writing Competition.

On August 18, 2015, the Mark Gordon Company announced that Anne Hathaway would star in a limited TV series adaptation of the novel.
