= Jan Steckel =

American poet

Jan M. Steckel
- Born: August 22, 1962; California, US
- Education: Harvard University (B.A., 1983); Yale University (M.D., 1994)
- Occupations: Pediatrician (retired), poet, short-story writer
- Spouse: Hew Wolff
- Writing career
- Genres: Poetry, Short stories
- Notable works: The Horizontal Poet (2011); The Underwater Hospital (2006)
- Notable awards: Lambda Literary Award: Bisexual Nonfiction (2011);
- Website: www.jansteckel.com

Jan Steckel is a San Francisco Bay Area-based writer of poetry, fiction and creative nonfiction, who is also known as an activist in the bisexual community and an advocate on behalf of the disabled and the underprivileged.

Steckel has published over a hundred of her short stories, poems and nonfiction pieces in print and in online publications such as Scholastic Magazine, Yale Medicine, Red Rock Review, So to Speak, Redwood Coast Review, and Bellevue Literary Review. Steckel's writing has been nominated twice for Pushcart Prizes: once for her nonfiction, and once for her poetry.

== Education and medical career ==
Steckel's undergraduate work was at Harvard-Radcliffe University, where she earned her B.A. in English literature with an emphasis on creative writing in 1983. Later she studied Golden Age Spanish Literature at Oxford University on a Henry Fellowship through 1984. In 1989 she took a few premedical courses while conducting research in the neuroscience laboratory. Steckel attended Yale University School of Medicine, where she picked up her M.D. in May 1994. Steckel's speciality was in pediatrics, in which she completed her residency at Children's Hospital Boston in July 1997.

Board-Certified in Pediatrics by the American Board of Pediatrics in 1997, Steckel obtained her Physician and Surgeon License from the Medical Board of California in 1997; she became a Fellow of the American Academy of Pediatrics in 2000.

Steckel served for a time in the Peace Corps as a volunteer in the Dominican Republic; upon her return to the States, she cared for Spanish-speaking families in California at a county hospital and at a large HMO. After she left medicine permanently in 2001, her experiences as a pediatrician continued to inform her work.

== Personal life ==
Steckel grew up in Santa Monica, where she attended Lincoln Junior High School (now Lincoln Middle School), studying journalism. She went to Santa Monica High School.

Steckel, openly bisexual, lives in Northern California with her husband Hew Wolff, who has collaborated on some of her poetry.

== Works ==
=== Books ===
- The Underwater Hospital [chapbook] (2006: Zeitgeist Press; ISBN 0-929730-76-3)

=== Other writing ===
- "Girl Lessons" in the online publication biMagazine, May 2007;
- "How to Have Great Sex When Your Back Hurts" in the Good Vibes Online Magazine (GV Weekly), February 7, 2007;
- "Getting It Rote: a Poetry Performance Practicum" in the Bay Area Poets Seasonal Review, Summer 2005. Reprinted online in Woman-Stirred, September 24, 2005;
- "Voyage to Planet California" in Bi Women, Vol. 15 No. 2, April/May 1997 (reprinted in the online journal Awakened Woman, February 5, 2004);
- "Telegram from Another Planet" and "Family Medicine" in the anthology Becoming Doctors, edited by Parminder Bolina, Student Doctors Press, 1995;

=== Poetry ===
- "The Horizontal Poet", 2011
- "The White Hospital" forthcoming in Bellevue Literary Review, Fall 2008;
- Al-Salaam Boccaccio" in the Redwood Coast Review, Winter 2007/2008;
- "Lake Bed" selected for the American Pain Foundation's Pain and Creativity Exhibit, October 2007;
- "The Maiden Aunts" in The Pedestal Magazine online, Issue 30, October/November 2005 (also forthcoming in Awakened Woman in 2006, and in the anthology Blood to Remember: American Poets on the Holocaust, 2nd edition, edited by Charles Fishman, Time Being Books, 2007);
- "Tiresias" in Diverticulum, Spring 1994 (reprinted in BiWomen, the newsletter of the Boston Bisexual Women's Network; awarded the Triplopia Magazine Best of the Best Award in 2006, and reprinted there along with an interview with Steckel by Tracy Koretsky, contributing editor to Triplopia and author of Ropeless. Reprinted in BiMagazine in December 2006).

=== Fiction ===
- "Truth in Free-Will Advertising" in The Eloquent Atheist, February 2008;
- "Bi-Dyke Bonnie and the Sword of Snart" online in biMagazine, August 2007;
- "The Sea That Sometimes Frightened Us" in the online journal Lodestar Quarterly, Summer 2004;
- "A Dish Best Eaten Chilled in Aspic" in Collection 33, May 1995;
- "Chemé" in Yale Medicine, Fall/Winter 1992–1993;
- "California Dreamin'" in Scholastic Magazine, 1975.

== Awards ==
- 2011 Lambda Literary Award: Bisexual Nonfiction
- The 2007 Jewel Prize by the Bay poetry competition, sponsored by the Frank Bette Center for the Arts;
- Triplopia's 2006 Best-of-the-Best Competition (open only to winning poems from other contests) for "Tiresias";
- Second Place for Poetry in The Pedestal Magazine's 2005 Pedestal Readers' Awards for "The Maiden Aunts";
- Finalist in the Blue Light Poetry Prize and Chapbook Contest, 2004;
- The Marguerite Rush Lerner Award for outstanding creative writing by a Yale medical student, 1992, for a collection of short stories.
