= Lambda Literary Award for Bisexual Literature =

American LGBT literary award

- Awarded for: Bisexual Literature
- Sponsored by: Lambda Literary Foundation
- Date: Annual

The Lambda Literary Award for Bisexual Literature is an annual literary award, presented by the Lambda Literary Foundation, that awards books with bisexual content. The award can be separated into three categories: bisexual fiction, bisexual nonfiction, and bisexual poetry. Awards are granted based on literary merit and bisexual content, and therefore, the writer may be bi-, homo-, hetero-, or asexual.

== Criteria ==
=== Bisexual fiction ===
The award for bisexual fiction recognizes "[n]ovels, novellas, short story collections, and anthologies with prominent bi/pan ... characters and/or content of strong significance to the bi/pan ... communities." The list "[m]ay include historical novels, comics, cross-genre works of fiction, humor, and other styles of fiction."

=== Bisexual nonfiction ===
The award for bisexual nonfiction recognizes "[n]onfiction works with content of strong significance to members of the bi/[pan] communities," including "a wide range of subjects for the general or academic reader."

=== Bisexual poetry ===
The award for bisexual poetry recognizes individual volumes of poems and poem collections with bisexual content. Chapbooks are ineligible for the prize, as well as "[u]pdated editions of previously published works ... unless at least 50% of the poetry (not the supplemental text) is new." If there are not enough eligible titles in any given year to support a dedicated bisexual poetry category, then bisexual poetry titles are considered in the fiction category.

== History ==
Before a Lambda Literary Award category was created for works of bisexual literature, books on bisexual topics were judged in categories designated for literature about other identities. In 1992, Bi Any Other Name: Bisexual People Speak Out, was placed in the Lambda category of Lesbian Anthology. In 2005, bisexual writer June Jordan's poetry book Directed by Desire: Collected Poems competed in the Lesbian Poetry category and won.

Bisexual activists spent years campaigning for the Lambda Literary Foundation to add a category awarding works of bisexual literature. For one year in 2002, the organization changed their recently established award for transgender literature into a combined "Transgender or Bisexual" category. When activists Sheela Lambert, Wendy Curry, and Amy Andre asked the foundation to create a category for bisexual literature, Lambda Literary said they would not due to a lack of books. In response, the activists searched for overlooked books to share with the foundation.

In 2006, the foundation added a dedicated category for bisexual literature. With time, the number of categories awarding works of bisexual literature changed. When it shrank back to one category in 2012, Lambert felt the bisexual literary community was being neglected. She established the annual, multi-category Bisexual Book Awards in response.

== Recipients ==
Award winners and finalists
Year	Category	Author	Work	Result	Ref.
2002	Bisexual/Transgender Literature	Virginia Ramey Mollenkott	Omnigender: A Trans-religious Approach	Winner	
2002	Bisexual/Transgender Literature	Sparrow L. Patterson	Synthetic Bi Products	Finalist	
2002	Bisexual/Transgender Literature	Bill Brnt and Carol Queen (editors)	Best Bisexual Erotica, Volume 2	Finalist	
2002	Bisexual/Transgender Literature	Vanessa Sheridan	Crossing Over: Liberating the Transgendered Christian	Finalist	
2002	Bisexual/Transgender Literature	Jonathan Branton	Dragged!! To His Senses	Finalist	
2007	Bisexual Literature	Michael Szymanski and Nicole Kristal	The Bisexual's Guide to the Universe	Winner	
2007	Bisexual Literature	Ron Jackson Suresha and Pete Chvany (editors)	Bi Men	Finalist	
2007	Bisexual Literature	Ronald C. Fox	Affirmative Psychotherapy with Bisexual Women & Bisexual Men	Finalist	
2007	Bisexual Literature	Serena Anderlini-D'Onofrio	Eros	Finalist	
2007	Bisexual Literature	Ron Jackson Suresha (editor)	Bi Guys	Finalist	
2007	Bisexual Literature	Clarence Nero	Three Sides to Every Story	Finalist	
2008	Bisexual Literature	Brent Hartinger	Split Screen	Winner	
2008	Bisexual Literature	Jeff Hobbs	The Tourists	Finalist	
2008	Bisexual Literature	Beth Firestein (editor)	Becoming Visible	Finalist	
2008	Bisexual Literature	Jennifer Baumgardner	Look Both Ways	Finalist	
2008	Bisexual Literature	Sheri Joseph	Stray	Finalist	
2009	Bisexual Literature	Jenny Block	Open	Winner	
2009	Bisexual Literature	Lisa M. Diamond	Sexual Fluidity: Understanding Women's Love & Desire	Finalist	
2009	Bisexual Literature	Ron J. Suresha	Kinsey Zero Through Sixty: Bisexual Perspectives on Kinsey	Finalist	
2009	Bisexual Literature	Edmund White	Rimbaud	Finalist	
2009	Bisexual Literature	Honor Moore	The Bishop's Daughter	Finalist	
2010	Bisexual Fiction	Mykola Dementiuk	Holy Communion	Winner	
2010	Bisexual Fiction	Maria Pallotta-Chiarolli	Love You Two	Finalist	
2010	Bisexual Fiction	Bobbie Geary	The Janeid	Finalist	
2010	Bisexual Fiction	J.E. Knowles	Arusha	Finalist	
2010	Bisexual Fiction	Amber Lehman	Torn	Finalist	
2010	Bisexual Nonfiction	Minal Hajratwala	Leaving India: My Family's Journey From Five Villages to Five Continents	Winner	
2010	Bisexual Nonfiction	Audrey Beth Stein	Map	Finalist	
2010	Bisexual Nonfiction	Blake Bailey	Cheever: A Life	Finalist	
2010	Bisexual Nonfiction	Emanuel Levy	Vincente Minnelli: Hollywood's Dark Dreamer	Finalist	
2010	Bisexual Nonfiction	Edna O'Brien	Byron in Love: A Short Daring Life	Finalist	
2011	Bisexual Fiction	Myrlin A. Hermes	The Lunatic, the Lover, and the Poet	Winner	
2011	Bisexual Fiction	Daniel Allen Cox	Krakow Melt	Finalist	
2011	Bisexual Fiction	Georgeann Packard	Fall Asleep Forgetting	Finalist	
2011	Bisexual Fiction	Malena Watrous	If You Follow Me	Finalist	
2011	Bisexual Fiction	Ann Herendeen	Pride/Prejudice: A Novel of Mr. Darcy, Elizabeth Bennet, and Their Forbidden Lovers	Finalist	
2011	Bisexual Nonfiction	Maria Pallotta-Chiarolli	Border Sexualities, Border Families in Schools	Winner	
2011	Bisexual Nonfiction	Candace Walsh and Laura Andre (editors)	Dear John, I Love Jane: Women Write about Leaving Men for Women	Finalist	
2011	Bisexual Nonfiction	Michael Gregg Michaud	Sal Mineo	Finalist	
2011	Bisexual Nonfiction	Paula Byrne	Mad World: Evelyn Waugh and the Secrets of Brideshead	Finalist	
2011	Bisexual Nonfiction	Patti Smith	Just Kids	Finalist	
2012	Bisexual Fiction	Barbara Browning	The Correspondence Artist	Winner	
2012	Bisexual Fiction	Ghalib Shiraz Dhalla	The Two Krishnas	Finalist	
2012	Bisexual Fiction	Katherine Scott Nelson	Have You Seen Me	Finalist	
2012	Bisexual Fiction	Alex Sanchez	Boyfriends With Girlfriends	Finalist	
2012	Bisexual Fiction	J.M. Frey	Triptych	Finalist	
2012	Bisexual Nonfiction	Jan Steckel	The Horizontal Poet	Winner	
2012	Bisexual Nonfiction	Qwo-Li Driskill Daniel Heath Justice, Deborah Miranda, and Lisa Tatonetti (editors)	Sovereign Erotics: A Collection of Two-Spirit Literature	Finalist	
2012	Bisexual Nonfiction	Jonathan Alexander and Serena Anderlini-D'Onofrio (editors)	Bisexuality and Queer Theory: Intersections, Connections and Challenges	Finalist	
2012	Bisexual Nonfiction	Susie Bright	Big Sex Little Death: A Memoir	Finalist	
2012	Bisexual Nonfiction	Ven Rey	Surviving Steven: A True Story	Finalist	
2013	Bisexual Literature	Cheryl Burke	My Awesome Place: The Autobiography of Cheryl B	Winner	
2013	Bisexual Literature	John Irving	In One Person	Winner	
2013	Bisexual Literature	Janet W. Hardy	Girlfag: A Life Told In Sex and Musicals	Finalist	
2013	Bisexual Literature	Richard Mason	History of a Pleasure Seeker	Finalist	
2013	Bisexual Literature	Scotty-Miguel Sandoe	Axel Hooley's Death Watch List	Finalist	
2014	Bisexual Fiction	Susan Choi	My Education	Winner	
2014	Bisexual Fiction	Mel Bossa	In His Secret Life	Finalist	
2014	Bisexual Fiction	Nicola Griffith	Hild: A Novel	Finalist	
2014	Bisexual Fiction	David Leavitt	The Two Hotel Francforts: A Novel	Finalist	
2014	Bisexual Fiction	Bushra Rehman	Corona	Finalist	
2014	Bisexual Nonfiction	Maria San Filippo	The B Word: Bisexuality in Contemporary Film and Television	Winner	
2014	Bisexual Nonfiction	Clive Davis	The Soundtrack of My Life	Finalist	
2014	Bisexual Nonfiction	Shiri Eisner	Bi: Notes for a Bisexual Revolution	Finalist	
2015	Bisexual Fiction	Ana Castillo	Give It to Me	Winner	
2015	Bisexual Fiction	Sheela Lambert (editor)	Best Bi Short Stories: Bisexual Fiction	Finalist	
2015	Bisexual Fiction	Ron J. Suresha	Extraordinary Adventures of Mullah Nasruddin	Finalist	
2015	Bisexual Fiction	Susie Hara	Finder of Lost Objects	Finalist	
2015	Bisexual Fiction	Vivek Shraya	She of the Mountains	Finalist	
2015	Bisexual Nonfiction	Charles M. Blow	Fire Shut Up In My Bones	Winner	
2015	Bisexual Nonfiction	Alan Cumming	Not My Father's Son	Finalist	
2015	Bisexual Nonfiction	Robyn Ochs and H. Sharif Williams (editors)	Recognize: The Voices of Bisexual Men	Finalist	
2016	Bisexual Literature	Emily Bingham	Irrepressible: The Jazz Age Life of Henrietta Bingham	Winner (tie)	
2016	Bisexual Literature	Anna North	The Life and Death of Sophie Stark	Winner (tie)	
2016	Bisexual Literature	Kevin Hogan	My Riastrad	Finalist	
2016	Bisexual Literature	Zoe Pilger	Eat My Heart Out	Finalist	
2016	Bisexual Literature	Jeanette Winterson	The Gap of Time	Finalist	
2017	Bisexual Fiction	Abigail Child	Mouth to Mouth	Winner	
2017	Bisexual Fiction	Martin Hyatt	Beautiful Gravity	Finalist	
2017	Bisexual Fiction	Alexis M. Smith	Marrow Island	Finalist	
2017	Bisexual Fiction	Leopoldine Core	When Watched	Finalist	
2017	Bisexual Nonfiction	Ana Castillo	Black Dove: Mamá, Mi'jo, and Me	Winner	
2017	Bisexual Nonfiction	Maria Pallotta-Chiarolli and Sara Lubowitz	Women in Relationships With Bisexual Men: Bi Men By Women	Finalist	
2017	Bisexual Nonfiction	Elizabeth Hall	I Have Devoted My Life to the Clitoris	Finalist	
2017	Bisexual Nonfiction	Ann Tweedy	The Body's Alphabet	Finalist	
2018	Bisexual Fiction	Barbara Browning	The Gift	Winner	
2018	Bisexual Fiction	Zoey Leigh Peterson	Next Year, for Sure	Finalist	
2018	Bisexual Fiction	Georgette Gouveia	The Penalty for Holding	Finalist	
2018	Bisexual Fiction	Andrea Lawlor	Paul Takes the Form of a Mortal Girl	Finalist	
2018	Bisexual Fiction	J.E. Sumerau	Homecoming Queens	Finalist	
2018	Bisexual Nonfiction	Roxane Gay	Hunger	Winner	
2018	Bisexual Nonfiction	Julene Tripp Weaver	Truth Be Bold: Serenading Life & Death in the Age of AIDS	Finalist	
2018	Bisexual Nonfiction	Monica Meneghetti	What the Mouth Wants	Finalist	
2019	Bisexual Fiction	Négar Djavadi, with Tina Kover (trans.)	Disoriental	Winner	
2019	Bisexual Fiction	Jennifer Natalya Fink	Bhopal Dance: A Novel	Finalist	
2019	Bisexual Fiction	Nathan Alling Long	The Origin of Doubt: Fifty Short Fictions	Finalist	
2019	Bisexual Fiction	Katrina Carrasco	The Best Bad Things: A Novel	Finalist	
2019	Bisexual Fiction	Jude Lucens	Behind These Doors: Radical Proposals Book 1	Finalist	
2019	Bisexual Fiction	Emily Strelow	The Wild Birds	Finalist	
2019	Bisexual Fiction	J.E. Sumerau	Palmetto Rose	Finalist	
2019	Bisexual Fiction	Lilah Suzanne	Jilted	Finalist	
2019	Bisexual Nonfiction	Anthony Moll	Out of Step: A Memoir	Winner	
2019	Bisexual Nonfiction	Julietta Singh	No Archive Will Restore You	Finalist	
2019	Bisexual Nonfiction	Sophie Lucido Johnson	Many Love: A Memoir of Polyamory and Finding Love(s)	Finalist	
2019	Bisexual Poetry	Duy Doan	We Play a Game	Winner	
2019	Bisexual Poetry	Fatimah Asghar	If They Come for Us	Finalist	
2019	Bisexual Poetry	Marcelo Hernandez Castillo	Cenzontle	Finalist	
2019	Bisexual Poetry	Xemiyulu Manibusan Tapepechul	My Woman Card Is anti-Native & Other Two-Spirit Truths	Finalist	
2019	Bisexual Poetry	Frances Donovan	Mad Quick Hand of the Seashore: Love Poems	Finalist	
2020	Bisexual Fiction	Fiona Alison Duncan	Exquisite Mariposa	Winner	
2020	Bisexual Fiction	Alia Trabucco Zerán, with Sophie Hughes (trans.)	The Remainder	Finalist	
2020	Bisexual Fiction	Garrett Leigh	Jude	Finalist	
2020	Bisexual Fiction	Deborah Levy	The Man Who Saw Everything	Finalist	
2020	Bisexual Fiction	Jess Taylor	Just Pervs	Finalist	
2020	Bisexual Fiction	Tomas Moniz	Big Familia	Finalist	
2020	Bisexual Fiction	Carley Moore	The Not Wives	Finalist	
2020	Bisexual Fiction	Zack Smedley	Deposing Nathan	Finalist	
2020	Bisexual Nonfiction	Trisha Low	Socialist Realism	Winner	
2020	Bisexual Nonfiction	Janet W. Hardy	IMPERVIOUS: Confessions of a Semi-Retired Deviant	Finalist	
2020	Bisexual Nonfiction	Victoria Freeman	A World Without Martha: A Memoir of Sisters, Disability, and Difference	Finalist	
2020	Bisexual Poetry	Stephanie Young	Pet Sounds	Winner	
2020	Bisexual Poetry	Moina Pam Dick	Moira of Edges, Moira the Tart	Finalist	
2020	Bisexual Poetry	Dorothy Chan	Revenge of the Asian Woman	Finalist	
2020	Bisexual Poetry	Camonghne Felix	Build Yourself a Boat	Finalist	
2020	Bisexual Poetry	Faylita Hicks	HoodWitch	Finalist	
2020	Bisexual Poetry	Ariana Reines	A Sand Book	Finalist	
2020	Bisexual Poetry	Cam Scott	ROMANS/SNOWMARE	Finalist	
2020	Bisexual Poetry	mai c. doan	water/tongue	Finalist	
2021	Bisexual Fiction	Zaina Arafat	You Exist Too Much	Winner	
2021	Bisexual Fiction	Sulaiman Addonia	Silence Is My Mother Tongue	Finalist	
2021	Bisexual Fiction	Talia Hibbert	Take a Hint, Dani Brown	Finalist	
2021	Bisexual Fiction	Elisabeth Thomas	Catherine House	Finalist	
2021	Bisexual Fiction	C Pam Zhang	How Much of These Hills is Gold	Finalist	
2021	Bisexual Nonfiction	Samantha Irby	Wow, No Thank You.: Essays	Winner	
2021	Bisexual Nonfiction	Alden Jones	The Wanting Was a Wilderness: Cheryl Strayed's Wild and the Art of Memoir	Finalist	
2021	Bisexual Nonfiction	Emma Copley Eisenberg	The Third Rainbow Girl: The Long Life of a Double Murder in Appalachia	Finalist	
2021	Bisexual Nonfiction	Shayla Lawson	This Is Major: Notes of Diana Ross, Dark Girls, and Being Dope	Finalist	
2021	Bisexual Nonfiction	Natasha Sajé	Terroir: Love, Out of Place	Finalist	
2021	Bisexual Poetry	Aricka Foreman	Salt Body Shimmer	Winner	
2021	Bisexual Poetry	Jody Chan	sick	Finalist	
2021	Bisexual Poetry	S*an D. Henry-Smith	Wild Peach	Finalist	
2021	Bisexual Poetry	George Abraham	Birthright	Finalist	
2021	Bisexual Poetry	Meghan Privitello	One God at a Time	Finalist	
2022	Bisexual Fiction	Alix Ohlin	We Want What We Want	Winner	
2022	Bisexual Fiction	S. J. Sindu	Blue-Skinned Gods	Finalist	
2022	Bisexual Fiction	Melissa Broder	Milk Fed	Finalist	
2022	Bisexual Fiction	Tiphanie Yanique	Monster in the Middle	Finalist	
2022	Bisexual Fiction	Jen Silverman	We Play Ourselves	Finalist	
2022	Bisexual Nonfiction	Aisha Sabatini Sloan	Borealis	Winner	
2022	Bisexual Nonfiction	Hasanthika Sirisena	Dark Tourist: Essays	Finalist	
2022	Bisexual Nonfiction	Jen Winston	Greedy: Notes from a Bisexual Who Wants Too Much	Finalist	
2022	Bisexual Nonfiction	Daisy Hernández	The Kissing Bug: A True Story of a Family, an Insect, and a Nation's Neglect of a Deadly Disease	Finalist	
2022	Bisexual Nonfiction	Courtney Cook	The Way She Feels: My Life on the Borderline in Pictures and Pieces	Finalist	
2022	Bisexual Poetry	Aurielle Marie	Gumbo Ya Ya	Winner	
2022	Bisexual Poetry	Muriel Leung	Imagine Us, The Swarm	Finalist	
2022	Bisexual Poetry	CM Burroughs	Master Suffering	Finalist	
2022	Bisexual Poetry	Paige Quiñones	The Best Prey	Finalist	
2022	Bisexual Poetry	Jackie Wang	The Sunflower Cast a Spell To Save Us From The Void	Finalist	
2023	Bisexual Fiction	Gwendolyn Kiste	Reluctant Immortals	Winner	
2023	Bisexual Fiction	A. J. Bermudez	Stories No One Hopes Are About Them	Finalist	
2023	Bisexual Fiction	Akil Kumarasamy	Meet Us by the Roaring Sea	Finalist	
2023	Bisexual Fiction	Bushra Rehman	Roses, In the Mouth of a Lion	Finalist	
2023	Bisexual Fiction	Nishant Batsha	Mother Ocean Father Nation	Finalist	
2023	Bisexual Nonfiction	Maria San Filippo	Appropriate Behavior	Winner	
2023	Bisexual Nonfiction	John Brady McDonald	Carrying It Forward	Finalist	
2023	Bisexual Nonfiction	Liz Scheier	Never Simple	Finalist	
2023	Bisexual Nonfiction	Rachel Krantz	Open	Finalist	
2023	Bisexual Nonfiction	CJ Hauser	The Crane Wife	Finalist	
2023	Bisexual Poetry	Nicky Beer	Real Phonies and Genuine Fakes	Winner	
2023	Bisexual Poetry	Gabrielle Octavia Rucker	Dereliction	Finalist	
2023	Bisexual Poetry	James Fujinami Moore	indecent hours	Finalist	
2023	Bisexual Poetry	Karyna McGlynn	50 Things Kate Bush Taught Me About the Multiverse	Finalist	
2023	Bisexual Poetry	Rebecca Hawkes	Meat Lovers	Finalist	
2024	Bisexual Fiction	Ling Ling Huang	Natural Beauty	Winner	
2024	Bisexual Fiction	Ruth Madievsky	All-Night Pharmacy: A Novel	Finalist	
2024	Bisexual Fiction	Jennifer Savran Kelly	Endpapers	Finalist	
2024	Bisexual Fiction	Sarah James	Last Night at the Hollywood Canteen	Finalist	
2024	Bisexual Fiction	Haley Jakobson	Old Enough	Finalist	
2024	Bisexual Non-fiction	Myriam Gurba	Creep: Accusations and Confessions	Winner	
2024	Bisexual Non-fiction	Vaneet Mehta	Bisexual Men Exist: A Handbook for Bisexual, Pansexual and M-Spec Men	Finalist	
2024	Bisexual Non-fiction	Zachary Zane	Boyslut: A Memoir and Manifesto	Finalist	
2024	Bisexual Non-fiction	Eden Boudreau	Crying Wolf	Finalist	
2024	Bisexual Non-fiction	Kawika Guillermo	Nimrods: a fake-punk self-hurt anti-memoir	Finalist	
2024	Bisexual Poetry	Danielle Cadena Deulen	Desire Museum	Winner	
2024	Bisexual Poetry	Mary Jo Bang	A Film in Which I Play Everyone	Finalist	
2024	Bisexual Poetry	Sierra DeMulder	Ephemera	Finalist	
2024	Bisexual Poetry	Margaret Ray	Good Grief, the Ground	Finalist	
2024	Bisexual Poetry	Paul Killebrew	Impersonal Rainbow & The Bisexual Purge	Finalist	
2025	Bisexual Fiction	Muriel Leung	How To Fall in Love in a Time of Unnameable Disaster	Winner	
2025	Bisexual Fiction	August Thompson	Anyone's Ghost	Finalist	
2025	Bisexual Fiction	Rebecca K Reilly	Greta & Valdin	Finalist	
2025	Bisexual Fiction	Casey McQuiston	The Pairing: Special 1st Edition	Finalist	
2025	Bisexual Fiction	Kimberly King Parsons	We Were the Universe	Finalist	
2025	Bisexual Non-fiction	Desiree Akhavan	You're Embarrassing Yourself	Winner	
2025	Bisexual Non-fiction	Jon Macy	Djuna: The Extraordinary Life of Djuna Barnes	Finalist	
2025	Bisexual Non-fiction	Lilly Dancyger	First Love: Essays on Friendship	Finalist	
2025	Bisexual Non-fiction	Rebecca Orchant	Simmering: A Kitchen Memoir	Finalist	
2025	Bisexual Non-fiction	Morgan Parker	You Get What You Pay For	Finalist	
2025	Bisexual Poetry	Jeddie Sophronius	Interrogation Records	Winner	
2025	Bisexual Poetry	Brittany Rogers	Good Dress	Finalist	
2025	Bisexual Poetry	Dorothy Chan	Return of the Chinese Femme	Finalist	
2025	Bisexual Poetry	Nathan Mader	The Endless Animal	Finalist	
2025	Bisexual Poetry	Niki Herd	The Stuff of Hollywood	Finalist	
2026	Bisexual Fiction	Demree McGhee	Sympathy for Wild Girls	Winner	
2026	Bisexual Fiction	A. M. Sosa	And I'll Take Out Your Eyes	Finalist	
2026	Bisexual Fiction	Melissa Lozada-Oliva	Beyond All Reasonable Doubt, Jesus Is Alive!: Stories	Finalist	
2026	Bisexual Fiction	Kerry Cullen	House of Beth	Finalist	
2026	Bisexual Fiction	Anbara Salam	The Salvage	Finalist	
2026	Bisexual Non-fiction	Lidia Yuknavitch	Reading the Waves	Winner	
2026	Bisexual Non-fiction	Gabrielle Drolet	Look Ma, No Hands	Finalist	
2026	Bisexual Non-fiction	Catherine Lacey	The Möbius Book	Finalist	
2026	Bisexual Non-fiction	Lee Horikoshi Roripaugh	unMothered, unTongued	Finalist	
2026	Bisexual Non-fiction	Wayne Scott	The Maps They Gave Us: One Marriage, Reimagined	Finalist	
2026	Bisexual Poetry	Anna Swanson	The Garbage Poems	Winner	
2026	Bisexual Poetry	Clayre Benzadón, edited by Sara Wagner	Moon as Salted Lemon	Finalist	
2026	Bisexual Poetry	Liza Flum	Hover	Finalist	
2026	Bisexual Poetry	Rebecca Salazar	antibody	Finalist	
2026	Bisexual Poetry	Chet'la Sebree	Blue Opening	Finalist	
