= Rosebud Ben-Oni =

Latina-Jewish American poet and writer

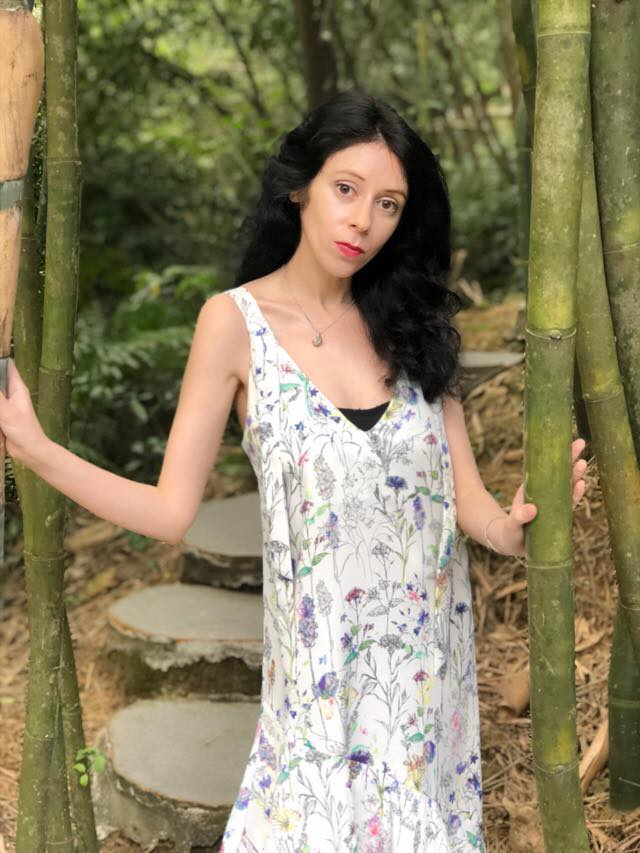
- Education: New York University, University of Michigan
- Writing career
- Genre: Poetry

Rosebud Ben-oni is a Latina-Jewish American poet and writer known for her "Poet Wrestling with" series. Her 2021 work If This Is the Age We End Discovery won the Alice James Award and was a Finalist for the National Jewish Book Award in Poetry. Her poetry and lyrical essays have been commissioned by Paramount, the National September 11 Memorial & Museum and Museum of Jewish Heritage in NYC.

== Life ==
Ben-Oni graduated from New York University. She was a Rackham Merit Fellow at the University of Michigan. She has received literature fellowships and grants from the New York Foundation for the Arts, CantoMundo, Café Royal Cultural Foundation, City Artists Corps and Queens Council on the Arts. In May 2022, Paramount commissioned her video essay “My Judaism is a Wild unPlace" for a campaign for Jewish Heritage Month, which appeared on Paramount Network, MTV Networks, The Smithsonian Channel, VH1 and many others.

Her poem "Dancing with Kiko on the Moon" was featured on Tracy K. Smith's The Slowdown. In 2017, the National September 11 Memorial & Museum commissioned her poem "Poet Wrestling with Angels in the Dark." From 2015 to 2021, she wrote weekly for the blog of The Kenyon Review. She currently lives in New York City, teaches at the University of California, Los Angeles, and has also taught at Poets House. She is a former Editorial Advisor for VIDA: Women in Literary Arts. She has performed at Carnegie Hall for International Holocaust Memorial Day as part “We Are Here: Songs From The Holocaust." In 2024, the Museum of Jewish Heritage commissioned and filmed her poem "When You Are the Arrow of Time" for Andy Goldsworthy's Garden of Stones exhibit; Ben-Oni also wrote a short introduction to the poem, noting the 1984 film Threads had a lasting impact on her work.

== Books ==
If This is the Age We End Discovery received a Starred Review from Booklist as an "astonishing work for adventurous readers intrigued by science and literature...Ben-Oni draws on the odd properties of supersymmetry to create a dexterous collection of electric lyrics that defies conventions of science and syllabics alike." Publishers Weekly states that in If This is the Age We End Discovery, is "Ben-Oni tackles major existential issues—creation, nullification, personal experience, objective truth—with grace, humor, and linguistic flair...while the poet struggles with the big questions, she also makes room for a playful and wishful hope that the creative act can offer humanity a fresh perspective...This ruminative collection blends poetry and science to make the unknown sing.”Harvard Review writes "these epics could be described as Latinx surrealism. The poems are electric and musical, with varying forms; some occupy an entire page in tight stanzaic forms, while others expand into loose wispy phrases that occupy only parts of the page. Ben-Oni takes readers through marvelous soundscapes derived from the algorithms of imagination..." The Rupture declares that "Ben-Oni is an absolute empress of form...it's hard to believe If This Is the Age We End Discovery was written pre-pandemic, in the sense that what these poems contend with feels not just timely but prescient. Permeability, mortality, divinity, the insidious fallacy of the real/artificial divide, the inevitable rupture of both natural and familial ecosystems; these themes flash before a spotlight Ben-Oni refuses to shine in any single direction, sending the brxght xyx of her intellect caroming from mystery to mystery, twinned by the sharp report of her incisive phrasing." The Millions praised the collection as "Ben-Oni courts wonder throughout this book, while acknowledging that opening ourselves to the search can be perilous."

Her second collection, turn around, BRXGHT XYXS, was published by Get Fresh LLC in Fall 2019, and won the Bisexual Poetry Award at the 8th Annual Bisexual Book Awards from the Bi Writers Association. "Matarose lives in Queens, New York, and she's a queen herself," wrote Dorothy Chan in her review of turn around, BRXGHT XYXS in Poetry Magazine, "Ben-Oni’s speaker constantly gives us meta: she basks in the cultural references of her childhood, yet she transcends them. If popular culture serves as commentary that combines the politics and social critiques of a time period, then the poet takes this up ten notches, presenting popular culture from both her coming-of-age youth and the present moment in time....I read turn around, BRXGHT XYXS as a poetic striptease." Chicago Review of Books called turn around, BRXGHT XYXS "a book-length love poem to the self that would make Whitman both proud and blush. Ben-Oni’s poems are ecstatically and unabashedly feminist, queer, punk, Latinx, and Jewish, making hers a unique and vital voice for our times.” Jewish Currents states that "the propulsion and scope of Ben-Oni's poems— engaging everything from biblical figures to '80s music— give each word an exhilarating amount of power... turn around, BRXGHT XYXS audaciously owns its otherness, traveling the world—and the universe—without losing sight of the United States we now inhabit."

Her chapbook 20 Atomic Sonnets was published online from Black Warrior Review; Ben-Oni states she wanted "to make 20 Atomic Sonnets free [and] available online, as to reach as many people as possible in the time of this (Covid-19) pandemic....this chapbook is part of a larger project that will be a full-length collection in the future." In her review for Rhino, Dona Vorreyer writes: "“Who knew that one could feel sorry for an electron, be smitten with the bad-boy toxicity of Fluorine, commiserate with the unstable loneliness of Cesium, or swoon over the sensuality of Gallium?…This chapbook renews a wonder in science… With its tour-de-force attention to detail, its enticing sounds and rhythms and its clever and astute references, 20 Atomic Sonnets leaves the reader wanting more. And hopefully with many more elements in the periodic table, this set of sonnets will only be the beginning.” Leslie Archibald states in Interstellar Flight Press: "“I wanted to review this collection of sonnets because I wanted to fall in love. I wanted to fall in love with the sonnet again and I did… In 20 Atomic Sonnets, the unique structure coupled with the author’s use of slant and embedded rhyme creates the sonnet aesthetic without overpowering the text…Ben-Oni pays homage to nineties metal poets by relating certain elements to groups like Nirvana, STP, and Bon Jovi.”

== Ben-Oni's Theory of Efes ==
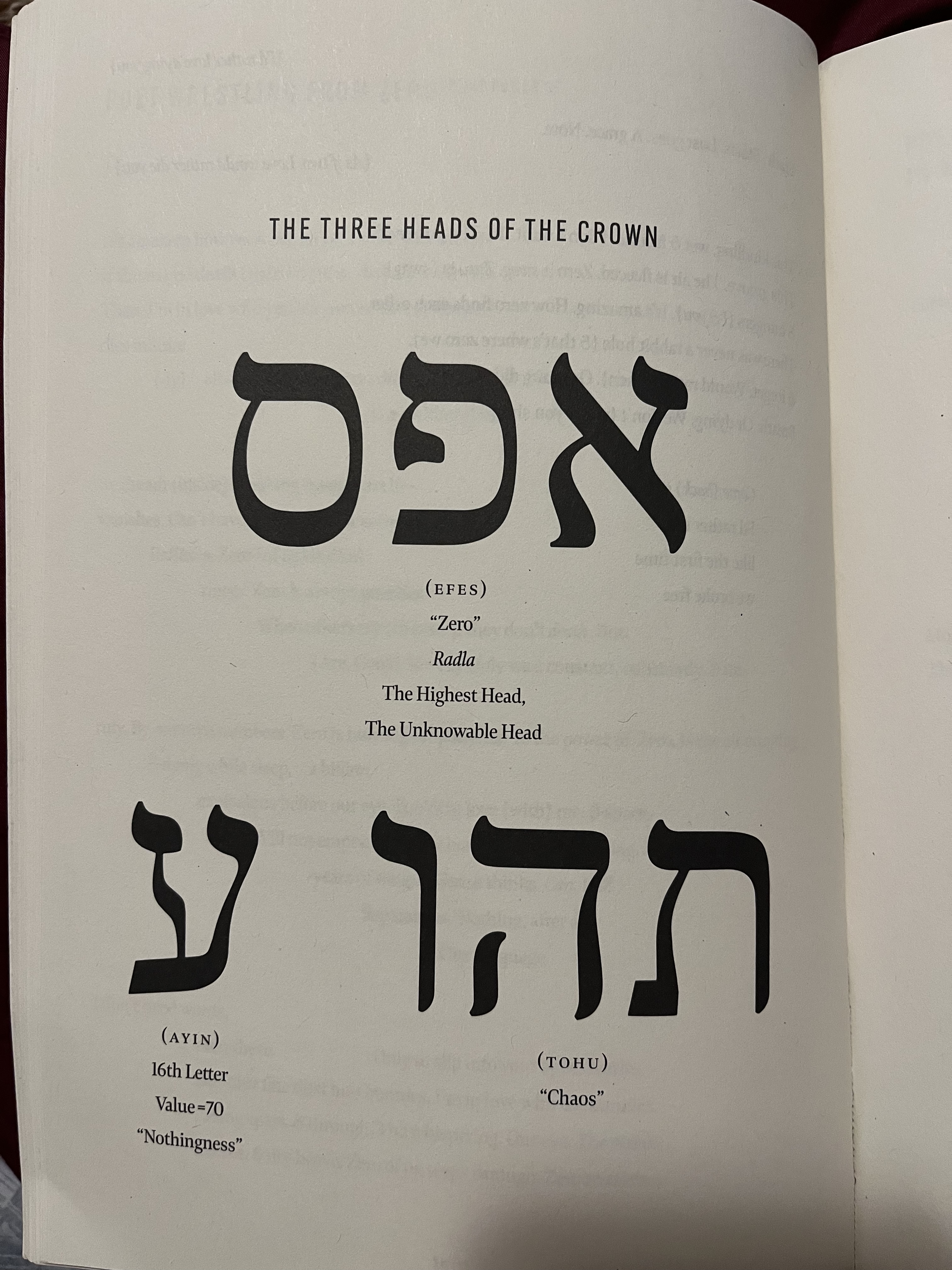
Ben-Oni's Theory of Efes

In her collection If This is the Age We End Discovery, Ben-Oni creates a groundbreaking concept of evolution as "Transformation by Nullification" by mixing modern physics, poetry and Judaism. She puts forward an "opposite" depiction of The Three Heads of the Crown, rooted in her world of Efes, which she defines first as: (1) Modern Hebrew for “zero” but more importantly, (2) a power that has the means “to nullify, to conceal.” She goes on define it further in her "Poet’s Proposal" as (3) "responsible for Dark Energy, vampire bunnies & insomnia; insatiable lover; enemy of mathematics & elegant equations; Creation’s Twin; presents Nullification properties as possible Transformation (rather than destruction) of the quantum & the “real” worlds; reveals Itself at the singularity of a black hole; does not abide by any law; changes the riddle." Ben-Oni later further explained Efes as "one of the fundamental forces in the universe not yet understood. Efes is responsible for, among many things, Dark Energy (or perhaps it is Dark Energy), which is accelerating the expansion of this universe. Efes is the enemy of mathematics and elegant equations because we can neither produce nor perceive “true” zero; even in a vacuum, there are still tiny, tiny particles flitting in and out of existence. And to even speak or think about zero is to speak about something. So Efes remains the ultimate mystery we will always brush against, but never fully grasp."

== Selected work ==
=== Books ===
- If This is the Age We End Discovery. Alice James Books, 2021. ISBN 9781948579155
- turn around, BRXGHT XYXS. Get Fresh LLC, 2019. ISBN 9780998935898
- Solecism: poems. Virtual Artists Collective, 2013. ISBN 9780944048504, OCLC 829764410

=== Chapbooks ===
- 20 Atomic Sonnets. Black Warrior Review. 2020.

=== Selected Work ===
- "_{88}Ra ::Halo Undarkness My ( :: Glowing End ::)" Poetry Northwest. Winter & Spring 2025, Volume XIX, Issue 2: 40.
- “You Cannnot Invent Me (Yet I Did, I Do)” The Writer’s Chronicle. December 2024.
- "86Rn :: { Rodan :: Radon }." The Missouri Review's Poem of the Week. 11 November 2024.
- "_{23}V ::¡Vanadium!" AGNI. Fall 2024, Issue 100: 78–79.
- “When You Are the Arrow of Time.” Commissioned and filmed by the Museum of Jewish Heritage— A Living Memorial to the Holocaust in NYC. January 11th, 2024.
- "You Cannot Invent Me." North American Review. Summer 2023. Volume 308, Number 2: 48–49.
- "My Judaism is a Wild unplace." Commissioned and filmed by Paramount Networks for National Jewish Heritage Month. May 2023.
- “It Is My Impish Era” and “AntiMatarose! Strikes! Again(!)" The Journal. Spring 2023. Issue 46.3.
- “\D E A T {H :: O R S E} \\\.” The Massachusetts Review. Winter 2022. Volume 63, No. 4.
- “Qaemot for What Would Make Us Planets and other poems" Waxwing. Winter 2022. Issue XXVI.
- “Night{Call} :: Post-Assault Bathing” Poetry Wales. Winter 2021. Vol. 57, No. 2: 55.
- “So They Say— They Finally Nailed— the Proton’s Size— & Hope— Dies—” Poem-A-Day: Academy of American Poets. September 24, 2020.
- "Poet Wrestling with Blood Falling Silent" Poetry. July/August 2020 Issue.
- "Poet Wrestling with Surface Tension" Poetry. December 2019 Issue.
- "Poet Wrestling with Her Empire of Dirt" Poetry. February 2019 Issue.
- "Poet Wrestling with Atonement." Academy of American Poets. 2018.
- "Poet Wrestling with Angels in the Dark." Kenyon Review. January/February 2018. Originally commissioned by the National September 11tth Memorial and Museum.
- "Poet Wrestling with Starhorse in the Dark" Tin House. Summer 2018 Issue.
- "Poet Wrestling with the Possibility She's Living in a Simulation." Guernica, 25 June 2018.
- "A Horse Dies Once That Is a Lie" POETRY Magazine, January 2018.
- "I Guess We'll Have to Be Secretly in Love with Each other & Leave it at That" Frontier Poetry, 17 Nov 2017.
- "Axolotls Do It Better, So Now I Am an Axolot" The Adroit Journal. Issue 23, 2017.
- "Matarose Tags G-Dragon on the 7." POETRY Magazine, October 2016.
- "On Childbearing." Prairie Schooner, Volume 90, Number 3, Fall 2016.
- "Forgetting is the Ghost that Keeps You Alive." Prelude, Issue 3. 2016.
- "All That Is and Is Not Nuclear Is Our Family." The Journal, Issue 40.4, Fall 2016
- "From The Last Great Adventure Is You." Waxwing, Issue IX, Summer 2016.
- “Despite Their Best Efforts.” The American Poetry Review. January/February 2014, Vol. 43, No.1: 16.
