= Aricka Foreman =

American poet, essayist and digital curator

Aricka Foreman is an American poet, essayist, and digital curator. She is the author of the books Dream with a Glass Chamber (2016) and Salt Body Shimmer (2020). Among other honors, Salt Body Shimmer won the 2021 Lambda Literary Award for Bisexual Poetry.

Foreman is from Detroit, Michigan but currently lives in Chicago, Illinois. Aside from writing and curating art, Foreman serves on the board of directors for The Offing.

== Awards and honors ==
=== Literary awards ===
Foreman's Salt Body Shimmer received the following accolades:

- Lambda Literary Award in Bisexual Poetry winner (2021)
- CLMP Firecracker Award in Poetry finalist (2021)
- Big Other Book Award in Poetry finalist (2020)
- Big Other Reader's Choice Award finalist (2020)

=== Fellowship ===
Foreman has received the following fellowships:

- Cave Canem Fellowship (2008, 2010, 2012, 2020)
- Callaloo
- Millay Colony

== Publications ==
=== Books ===
- Dream with a Glass Chamber (YesYes Books, 2016)
- Salt Body Shimmer (YesYes Books, 2020)

=== Digital curation ===
==== As artist ====
- "Queer as Verb: 7 Trans & Non-Binary Artists Doing the Work" (2015)
- "Except, All of Us" with Mimi Wong (2016)
- "I Slay: 11 Women Artists & Writers To Get Us Into Formation" (2016)
- "Courage in the Chasm" (2016)
- "Marginalized and Mythological: Shanequa Gay's Disruption of the Pastoral Landscape" (2018)

==== As editor ====
- Brandon Tauzsik, Nate Marshall, Quincy T. Mills's "Tapered Throne/Bald Fade" (2015)
- E. Jane's "The Coded Body" (2015)
- Angela Davis Fegan's "Lavender Menace: Feminist Fury and Visibility in Public Space" (2015)
- Kaitlyn Greenidge and Laylah Ali's "Four Tales for Dry Land" (2016)
- Krista Franklin's "History, As Written By The Victors" (2016)

=== Essays ===
- "Why Spotlight Minority Mental Health?" in The Offering (2015)
- "Let Me Get Carefree Unless It Means I Live In This Political Body And Everything Is Always On Fire Or How I Went To A Santigold Concert To Get Carefree Anyway" on Vinyl Poetry and Prose (2016)
- "In Defense of Fast Girls Who Just Want to Dance" in Catapult (2018)

=== Select poems ===
- "Dig" in Vinyl Poetry and Prose (2011)
- "Like the Rain, Smell It Coming" in Vinyl Poetry and Prose (2011)
- "Made Mostly of Water" in Vinyl Poetry and Prose (2011)
- "Monologues in Bars By White People With Good Intentions" in The James Franco Review (2015)
- "I Got Mad Love" in The James Franco Review (2015)
- "Consent Is A Labyrinth of Yes" in The James Franco Review (2015)
- "go here nothing to see home" in Thrush Poetry Journal (2015)
- "When We Say We Want Tenderness We Haven't Found A Punishment We Can Live With" in The Collagist (2016)
- "Still Life of Acme in Spring" in The Collagist (2016)
- "Field Study #1" in The Shade Journal (2016)
- "When The Therapist Asks You To Recount, You Have to Say It" on BuzzFeed (2017) and in Furious flower: seeding the future of African American poetry (2020)
- "Menarche Malarkey the Beginning the End," published in Verse (2020)
- "Does It Matter Who Is Your Redeemer," published in Verse (2020)
- "Mary Woodson Sets the Grits Straight," published in Verse (2020)
- "Breakbeat Aubade with Anemones and Lucky Fish," published in Verse (2020)
- "Polycystic Study of Intimacy" on Academy of American Poets' poets.org (2020)
- "Republic Americana" in Pinwheel Journal
- "Master of Your Make-Believe" in Pinwheel Journal
- "we live best/ in the spaces between two loves" in Anomaly
- "Breakbeat Aubade with Anemones and Lucky Fish" in Anomaly
