= Natural Beauty =

Natural Beauty may refer to:

- The general concept of beauty
- Area of Outstanding Natural Beauty, a designated geographic area in England, Wales, and Northern Ireland.
  - Area of Outstanding Natural Beauty (Wales)
  - Area of Outstanding Natural Beauty (Northern Ireland)
- Physical attractiveness
- "Natural Beauty", 1992 song by Neil Young from the album Harvest Moon
- Natural Beauty (novel), 2023 novel by Ling Ling Huang
