= Zaina Arafat =

Palestinian American writer

- Arafat at the 2026 Texas Book Festival
- Education: University of Virginia; Columbia University; University of Iowa
- Occupations: Writer; educator
- Writing career
- Notable work: You Exist Too Much
- Notable awards: Lambda Literary Award

Zaina Arafat is a Palestinian American writer and educator. She is the author of the novel You Exist Too Much, which won the 2021 Lambda Literary Award for Bisexual Fiction.

Arafat's essays and fiction have appeared in The New Yorker, The New York Times, and Granta.

== Life and career ==
Arafat grew up between the United States and the Middle East, and is based in Brooklyn, New York. She earned a B.A. from the University of Virginia, an M.A. from Columbia University, and an M.F.A. from the University of Iowa.

Her writing has appeared in publications including The Paris Review, The New Yorker, The New York Times, Granta, The Believer, Virginia Quarterly Review, The Atlantic, BuzzFeed, Vice, Guernica, Literary Hub, and NPR. She received the Arab Women/Migrants from the Middle East fellowship at Jack Jones Literary Arts.

Arafat teaches at Barnard College, and has also taught at the School of The New York Times and LIU Post. In 2024, she was interviewed in Seen about Palestinian diaspora writing and her forthcoming essay collection Our Arab.

== You Exist Too Much ==
Arafat's debut novel, You Exist Too Much, was published by Catapult Books in 2020. The novel was reviewed in Kirkus Reviews, NPR, Publishers Weekly, Los Angeles Review of Books, The Irish Times, and Washington Independent Review of Books. In 2021, it won the Lambda Literary Award for Bisexual Fiction.

Arafat discussed the novel in interviews and profiles published by Kirkus Reviews, Them, Xtra Magazine, and Huck.

== Works ==
- You Exist Too Much. New York: Catapult Books. 2020. ISBN 9781948226509.
- Our Arab: On Longing, Belonging, and Hope. New York: Little, Brown and Company (Hachette Books). September 29, 2026. ISBN 9780316584685.
- "Habibi City", New York
