= Silence Is My Mother Tongue =

2018 novel by Sulaiman Addonia

Silence Is My Mother Tongue is a novel by Sulaiman Addonia, published October 25, 2018 by Graywolf Press. The book was a finalist for the Lambda Literary Award for Bisexual Fiction and was longlisted for the Orwell Prize for Political Fiction. It follows " two siblings attempting to find stability within the chaos of a [refugee] camp."

== Background ==
The concept of "silence" being a "mother tongue" comes from Addonia's experience as a child refugee. Addonia has discussed his relationship to language in his essay, "The Wound of Multilingualism: On Surrendering the Languages of Home," wherein he notes that he has been forced to forgo "the language of home" on numerous occasions. Though his native language is Tigryina, Addonia attempted to learn Amharic while in an Ethiopian refugee camp, but the language reminded him of his murdered father, and therefore, it "was a language of grief, of violence, of loss, of unattained longing." He stepped out of it quickly and "returned to silence." When he was enrolled in a Sudanese school, his connection to his native languages dwindled, and by the time he moved to Saudi Arabia, he was fluent in Arabic. Upon arrival in England, Addonia began learning English, further disconnecting him from his history. Of the experience, Addonia has said

It was like taking a hammer to the home I had built in the Arabic language word by word, over many years in Sudan and Saudi Arabia. My increasing strength in English correlated negatively with my Arabic. The more I felt at home in English, the less Arabic felt like one. So much so that learning a new language was to acquire a new wound. Multilingualism meant multi-wounding.

Although learning English allowed him to connect with others in his new location, it also meant he could no longer understand his family, another reminder of their separation.

== Reception ==
Silence Is My Mother Tongue received positive reviews from The Guardian, Publishers Weekly, Kirkus, and The Colorado Review.

Kirkus Reviews called the book "[a] memorable chronicle about 'the bitterness of exile' and the endurance of the spirit."

The book was a finalist for the Lambda Literary Award for Bisexual Fiction and was longlisted for the Orwell Prize for Political Fiction.
