= Ron Suresha =

American author and editor (born 1958)

- Suresha in 2010
- Born: October 8, 1958 (age 67); Detroit, Michigan, USA
- Occupations: Author, editor
- Writing career
- Pen name: R. Jackson
- Period: late 20th/early 21st century
- Subjects: Bisexuality, Bear community
- Website: www.ronsuresha.com

Ron Jackson Suresha (born 1958) is an American author and editor of books centering on gay and bisexual men's subcultures, particularly the Bear community.

== Biography ==
Ron Jackson Suresha was born on October 8, 1958, in Detroit, to Jack and Naomi Suresha. He attended the University of Michigan and Vista College.

Suresha legally married Rocco Russo on October 10, 2004, in Provincetown, Massachusetts, then received a Connecticut civil union one year later. They lived until 2011 in New London, Connecticut and now live in New Milford, Connecticut, where Suresha serves as a Justice of the Peace. He has been an ordained minister of the Universal Life Church since 1975.

Suresha's nonfiction anthology, Bears on Bears: Interviews & Discussions (2002), includes 25 dialogues with 57 bear-identified men and bear-lovers from around the world, such as comedian Bruce Vilanch, porn model Jack Radcliffe, and Survivor star Richard Hatch. In the introduction, Suresha asserts that Bears on Bears is "the first interview book ... compiled primarily from online interactions" using online chat technology.

A bisexual-identified man and bi rights advocate, Suresha edited, with Peter Chvany, the nonfiction book Bi Men : Coming Out Every Which Way (2006). Suresha's two bisexual men's anthologies were named finalists in the 2006 Lambda Literary Award for Bisexual Literature.

In 2008, Suresha edited for Journal of Bisexuality a special issue commemorating the sexagennial (60th) anniversary of the publication of Sexual Behavior in the Human Male, commonly known as the Kinsey Report, as Bisexual Perspectives on the Life and Work of Alfred C. Kinsey, which was named a finalist in the 2008 Lambda Literary Awards in Bisexual Literature.

That year, Suresha cofounded Bear Bones Books, an imprint of LGBT publisher Lethe Press, which released a revised edition of his Bears on Bears, including five additional interviews. The imprint also reissued several men's fiction anthologies he edited under the pseudonym R. Jackson. In 2017, Suresha made Bear Bones Books an independent media outlet, reissuing several of his and other's books.

Suresha published in 2011 a folklore collection of humorous tales about the character Nasreddin, The Uncommon Sense of the Immortal Mullah Nasruddin which was named a Storytelling World Honor Title in 2012 in the adult collections category, and which received a 2013 Anne Izard Storytellers' Choice Award.

With Scott McGillivray, Suresha compiled and wrote a 2012 photobook, Fur: The Love of Hair, for German publisher Bruno Gmünder Verlag, which received a Rainbow Book Award.

In 2014, Suresha edited an anthology of poetry written by and for men of the bear community, Hibernation and Other Poems by Bear Bards, which was named a Rainbow Book Award winner in both the LGBTQ Poetry and Bisexuality categories. In 2014 he published a second collection of Nasreddin stories, Extraordinary Adventures of Mullah Nasruddin, named a Lambda Literary Award Finalist.

Suresha identified as a gay man "since puberty" until his forties. After cancer and several other midlife crises, Suresha came out as bisexual. Suresha says that this second coming out was "much more provocative and positive than my first arduous teenage process of self-discovery as gay, but just as much a rollercoaster."

In September 2019, in coordination with an exhibit at the New Milford (Conn.) Historical Society & Museum, Suresha presented an evening lecture on Florence Maybrick, the American woman wrongly accused of poisoning her British husband, entitled The Mystery of the Dress: The Cat Woman of Gaylordsville. Suresha two years later brought proposals before the Town Council of New Milford and the Town of Kent Selectmen, marking the 80th anniversary of Maybrick's October 1941 death in New Milford and burial in South Kent and noting her exoneration; both proposals were accepted, and on October 23, 2021, both towns observed Florence Chandler Maybrick Day.

== Publications ==
- Suresha, Ron, ed. (2002). Bearotica: Hot, Hairy, Heavy Fiction. Los Angeles: Alyson. ISBN 978-1-555-83577-4.
- Suresha, Ron (2002). Bears on Bears: Interviews and Discussions. Los Angeles: Alyson. ISBN 978-1-555-83578-1.
  - Suresha, Ron (2009). Bears on Bears: Interviews and Discussions. Bear Bones Books. ISBN 978-1-590-21244-8.
- Suresha, Ron, ed. (2004). Bear Lust: Hot, Hairy, Heavy Fiction. Los Angeles: Alyson. ISBN 978-1-555-83818-8.
- Suresha, Ron; Chvany, Pete, eds. (2005). Bi Men: Coming Out Every Which Way. Binghamton: Routledge. ISBN 978-1-560-23615-3.
- Suresha, Ron (2006). Bi Guys: Firsthand Fiction for Bisexual Men and Their Admirers. New York: Southern Tier Editions. ISBN 978-1-560-23329-9.
- Suresha, Ron, ed. (2009). Bisexual Perspectives on the Life and Work of Alfred C. Kinsey. Routledge. ISBN 978-0-415-87175-4.
- Suresha, Ron (2010). The Uncommon Sense of the Immortal Mullah Nasruddin: Stories, Jests, and Donkey Tales of the Beloved Persian Folk Hero. Lethe Press. ISBN 978-1-590-21175-5.
- Suresha, Ron (2014). Extraordinary Adventures of Mullah Nasruddin. Lethe Press. ISBN 978-1-590-21464-0.
- Suresha, Ron, ed. (2014). Hibernation and Other Poems by Bear Bards. Bear Bones Books. ISBN 978-1-590-21259-2.

== See also ==
- Bisexual Community
- Bisexual Resource Center
- Bear community
- Nasreddin Hoca
