= Maria San Filippo =

American author and educator

Maria San Filippo is an American author and educator. Her first book, The B Word, won the Lambda Literary Award for Bisexual Nonfiction; she also won the 2023 award for Appropriate Behavior.

San Filippo is also an associate professor at Emerson College.

== Education ==
San Filippo attended the London School of Economics before receiving a bachelor of arts in Film Studies and Political from Wellesley College. She went on to receive a master of arts fin Cinema Studies from New York University, and Ph.D. in Cinema and Media Studies from the University of California, Los Angeles.

In the 2020–21 school year, San Filippo was a U.S. Fulbright Scholar at the University of Innsbruck, Austria.

== Career ==
Aside from writing, San Filippo has been a lecturer at Wellesley College (2004, 2010–2013), University of California, Los Angeles (2007-2008), Harvard University (2010-2013), Massachusetts Institute of Technology (2012); Mellon Postdoctoral Fellow at Wellesley College (2008-2010); research associate at Five College Women's Studies Research Center (2012-2013); visiting assistant professor at Indiana University, Bloomington (2012-2013); assistant professor and director at University of the Arts (2016-2020); and assistant then associate professor at Goucher College (2016-2020). She has taught visual and media arts, communication and media studies, film and media studies, and gender studies.

San Filippo is currently an associate professor in the Department of Visual and Media Arts at Emerson College. Her academic work focuses "on screen media’s intersections with gender and sexuality, focusing on feminist and queer works of contemporary film and television." She is also editor-in-chief of New Review of Film & Television Studies.

== Selected texts ==
=== The B Word (2013) ===
The B Word: Bisexuality in Contemporary Film and Television was published April 1, 2013 by Indiana University Press. In 2014, the book won the Lambda Literary Award for Bisexual Nonfiction.

=== Appropriate Behavior (2022) ===
Appropriate Behavior, published in 2022 by McGill–Queen's University Press, also won the Lambda Literary Award for Bisexual Nonfiction, in 2023.

== Publications ==
=== Articles and book chapters ===
- “Boardwalk Xanadu: Time and Place in The King of Marvin Gardens and Atlantic City,” Senses of Cinema 13 (2001).
- “What a Long, Strange Trip It’s Been: Symbiopsychotaxiplasm Take One,” Film History 13.2 (2001): 216–225.
- “Two Women: The Dialectical Sexual Persona of Catherine Deneuve,” Senses of Cinema 23 (2002). Quoted in program notes for Deneuve retrospective at LACMA, March 2009.
- “The ‘Other’ Dreamgirl: Female Bisexuality as the ‘Dark Secret’ of David Lynch's Mulholland Drive,” Looking Both Ways: Bisexuality and the Media, special issue of Journal of Bisexuality 7.2 (2007): 15-49.
- “(Re)Constructing Bisexual Space in Contemporary Film/Culture,” Queer Space, special issue, English Language Notes, 45.2 (Fall/Winter 2007): 141-147.
- “Controversy and Compromise in the Code’s Waning Years: Hollywood Takes a Walk on the Wild Side,” Quarterly Review of Film and Video 26.5 (Fall 2009): 372–384.
- “Unthinking Heterocentrism: Bisexual Representability in Art Cinema.” In Global Art Cinema: New Theories and Histories, ed. Rosalind A. Galt and Karl Schoonover (Oxford UP, 2010), 75–91.
- “A Cinema of Recession: Micro-budgeting, Micro-drama, and the ‘Mumblecore’ Movement,” Slow Film, special issue of CineAction 85 (2011): 2-11. Supplementary “Mumblecore Montage”
- “More Than Buddies: Wedding Crashers and the Bromance as Comedy of (Re)Marriage Equality.” In Millennial Masculinity: Men in Contemporary American Cinema, ed. Timothy Shary (Wayne State UP, 2013), 181–199. “Highly Recommended” by Choice
- “A Room of Its Own: Screening Space and Spectatorial Experience in Yang Fudong’s Fifth Night and Omer Fast’s Continuity,” Art + Film, special issue of CineAction 91 (Fall 2013): 14-18.
- “Television’s Mid-life Crisis: Minimalism and Middle-Aged Masculinity in In Treatment and Louie,” Reevaluating Television, special issue of Cinephile 9.1 (Spring 2013): 21–25.
- “Before and After AfterEllen.com: On-line Queer Cinephile Communities as Critical Counterpublics.” In Film Criticism in the Digital Age: Media, Purposes, and the Status of the Critic, ed. Mattias Frey and Cecilia Sayad (Rutgers UP, 2015), 117–136. Best Essay in an Edited Collection Award, Society for Cinema and Media Studies, 2016.
- “Growing Old Together: Linklater’s Before Trilogy in the Twilight Years of Art House Distribution,” Film Quarterly 68.3 (Spring 2015): 53–59.
- “‘Selling Film’ in the summer of 2015: Midnight Sun, Il Cinema Ritrovato, and Karlovy Vary,” NECSUS: European Journal of Media Studies, Autumn 2015.
- “A Tale of Two Suzannes: À nos amours (For Our Loves, 1983) and Suzanne (2013),” Senses of Cinema 77, December 2015.
- Indie Reframed: Women's Filmmaking and Contemporary American Independent Cinema (2016)
- “Sexual In-betweener/Industry In-betweener: The Career and Films of Lisa Cholodenko," in Indie Reframed: Women’s Filmmaking and Contemporary American Independent Cinema, edited by Linda Badley, Claire Perkins, and Michele Schreiber (Edinburgh UP, 2016), 221–238.
- “Transparent Family Values: Unmasking Sitcom Myths of Gender, Sex(uality), and Money," in The Sitcom Reader, 2nd edition, edited by Mary M. Dalton and Laura R. Linder (SUNY Press, 2016), 305–318. Supplementary Interview.
- “‘Art Porn’ Provocauteurs: Queer Feminist Performances of Embodiment in the Work of Catherine Breillat and Lena Dunham,” Performance and the Body, special issue of Velvet Light Trap 77 (Spring 2016): 28-49. Reprinted in Reading Lena Dunham’s Girls: Feminism, Post-Feminism, Authenticity, and Gendered Performance in Contemporary Television, edited by Meredith Nash and Imelda Whelehan (Palgrave, 2017), 165-180.
- “Doing Time: Queer Temporalities and Orange Is the New Black," in The Age of Netflix: Critical Essays on Streaming Media, Digital Delivery, and Instant Access, edited by Myc Wiatrowski and Cory Barker (McFarland, 2017), 75–97.
- “The Politics of Fluidity: Representing Bisexualities in 21st Century Screen Media," in The Routledge Companion to Media, Sex, and Sexuality, edited by Feona Attwood, Brian McNair, and Clarissa Smith (Routledge, 2017), 70–80.
- “‘Just Because I’m a Lesbian Doesn’t Mean I’m Evolved’: The ‘Bad Queer’ Women's Comedic Web Series,” Bad Objects, special issue of The Velvet Light Trap 85 (Spring 2020): 65-77.
- “Breaking Upwards: The Creative Uncoupling of Desiree Akhavan and Ingrid Jungermann,” Independent Women: From Film to Television, special issue of Feminist Media Studies, edited by Claire Perkins and Michele Schreiber, 19.7 (2019): 991–1008. Published by Routledge, 2021. Reprinted in After “Happily Ever After”: Romantic Comedy in the Post-Romantic Age, edited by Maria San Filippo (Detroit, Wayne State University Press, 2021), 275–300.
- “Open (to) Marriage: Saving Sanctioned Coupling through Consensual Non-Monogamy Narratives," in Imagining ‘We’ in the Age of ‘I,’: Romance and Social Bonding in Contemporary Culture, edited by Mary Harrod, Suzanne Leonard, and Diane Negra (Routledge, 2021), 93–109.
- “Mumblecore’s Second Act: Millennial Indie Moviemaking’s Migration to Television," in Indie TV, edited by James Lyons and Yannis Tzioumakis, Routledge, forthcoming March 2022.
- “Living in the Gray Area: Bisexual Signification in Desiree Akhavan’s The Bisexual," in Television Studies in Queer Times, edited by Hollis Griffin, Routledge. Contracted and manuscript under review.
- “The Re-Emergence of Radical Romantic Comedy," in The Oxford Handbook of Screen Comedy, edited by William Costanzo and Peter Kunze, chapter invited for proposal under review.
- “Full-Frontal Feminism: Jane Campion’s Sex Scenes," in Screening Sex: The Sex Scene, edited by Darren Kerr and Donna Peberdy, chapter invited for proposal under review.
- “In the Cut (Jane Campion, 2003).” Screening Adult Cinema, edited by Desirae Embree, Finley Freibert, and Peter Alilunas, essay invited for collection contracted at Routledge.

=== Books ===
- The B Word: Bisexuality in Contemporary Film and Television (2013)
- Provocauteurs and Provocations: Screening Sex in 21st Century Media (2021)
- Appropriate Behavior (2022)

=== Book reviews ===
- “American Films of the 70s: Conflicting Visions by Peter Lev,” Senses of Cinema 17 (2001).
- “Atom Egoyan by Carole Desbarats et al.,” Senses of Cinema 20 (2002).
- “Projecting Paranoia: Conspiratorial Visions in American Film by Ray Pratt,” Cineaste 27.2 (2002): 51-52.
- “Lost Illusions: American Cinema in the Shadow of Watergate and Vietnam, 1970-79 by David Cook,” Cineaste 28.2 (2003): 53-54.
- “Screen Chemistry: The Power of 2 by Martha Nochimson,” Cineaste 28.4 (2003): 68-69.
- “Performing American Masculinities: The 21st-Century Man in Popular Culture by Elwood Watson and Marc Edward Shaw, ed.,” Cinema Journal 53.1 (Fall 2013): 184-188.

=== Criticism and commentaries ===
- “Maude & Me; Or, Responsibilities of a Feminist Media Critic,” Flow, November 16, 2021.
- Themed Playlist: “Filming Abortion,” Centre for Screen Cultures, November 11, 2021.
- “The rom-com is alive and well and breaking new conventions,” The Boston Globe, September 19, 2021.
- “The Sex Scene Isn’t Disappearing…it’s simply shifting from clichéd fantasy to messy reality,” The Conversation, May 20, 2021. Reprinted in Salon, May 29, 2021.
- Themed Playlist (collaboratively created): “Post-Romantic Comedy,” Centre for Screen Cultures, May 27, 2021.
- “Now Is the Time of Monsters: A Roundtable on Contemporary Horror” (Introduction). NRFTS Blog (2021).
- Themed Playlist: “Screening Sexual Provocation,” Centre for Screen Cultures, March 18, 2021.
- “The Year of Screening Provocatively,” Indiana University Press Blog, February 8, 2021.
- “White Riot: A Joker Roundtable” (Introduction). NRFTS Blog (2021).
- “Serial Offender: The Bisexual (2018),” Journal of Bisexuality 20.3 (2020).
- “Visible: Out on Television”: an LGBTQ TV Roundtable, Los Angeles Review of Books, June 23, 2020.
- “The Revolutionary Thighs of Hannah Horvath,” Los Angeles Review of Books, February 21, 2017.
- “A Real Young Girl: Catherine Breillat’s Adolescent Wonderland,” Senses of Cinema 80 (2016).
- “Symbiopsychotaxiplasm: Take One,” National Film Registry, Library of Congress (2016).
- “Female Trouble: Representing Transwomen in The Danish Girl and The New Girlfriend,” Journal of Bisexuality, 16.3 (2016): 403-407.
- “Orgasm, Inc.,” Cineaste 36.1 (2011): 80.
- “Seeds of Summer,” War Films/Female Directors special issue of CineAction 81 (2010): 62-64.
- “Word Is Out,” Cineaste 35.3 (2010).
- “The Windmill Movie,” Cineaste 35.1 (2010): 88.
- “Malady of Death,” Calculated Risks exhibit catalog, Davis Museum and Cultural Center, Wellesley College, Fall 2010.
- “Outrage,” Cineaste 34.4 (2009): 80.
- “For the Bible Tells Me So,” Cineaste 33.2 (2008): 88.
- “Symbiopsychotaxiplasm Take One & Take 2 ½,” Cineaste 31.2 (2006): 48-49.
- “Producing Adults,” Girlfriends 11.7 (2005): 55.
- “Open My Heart,” Girlfriends 11.6 (2005): 57.
- “Lost in Translation,” Cineaste 29.1 (2004): 26-28.
- “Hidden Wars of Desert Storm,” Cineaste 27.4 (2001): 96.
- “Apocalypse Now Redux,” Senses of Cinema 16 (2001).
- “Long Night’s Journey into Day,” Cineaste 26.3 (2001): 72.
- “Barbie Nation,” Cineaste 26.2 (2001): 64.
- “Amores Perros,” Senses of Cinema 13 (2001).

=== Editor ===
- After "Happily Ever After": Romantic Comedy in the Post-Romantic Age (2021)
- Independent Women: From Film to Television (2021)

=== Festival reviews ===
- “Thin Air, Long Lines: 45th Telluride Film Festival,” Senses of Cinema 89 (2018).
- “The 49th Sydney Film Festival,” Scope (2003).
- “4th Bangkok Film Festival,” Senses of Cinema 18 (2002).
- “25th Atlanta Film & Video Festival,” Senses of Cinema 15 (2001).
- “20th Sundance Film Festival,” Senses of Cinema 12 (2001).

=== In Media Res posts ===
- “Already Out Queer Celebrity: Kate McKinnon’s Post-Closet Representational Politics.” Female Comedians theme week, In Media Res, March 11, 2020.
- “Breaking Upwards: The Creative Uncoupling of Desiree Akhavan and Ingrid Jungermann.” Media Collaborations theme week, In Media Res, November 12, 2019.
- “Learning In/humanity through Film in Dogtooth and The Wolfpack.” Movies about Movies theme week, In Media Res, April 20–24, 2015. Selected by IMR editors as a Favorite Post of 2015.
- “The Penis as Feminist Tool in Girls and Top of the Lake.” Just Add Nudity! theme week, In Media Res, October 6–10, 2014.
- “Doing Time: Queer Temporalities and Orange Is the New Black,“ Orange Is the New Black theme week [curator], In Media Res, March 10–14, 2014.
- “Owning Her Abjection: Lena Dunham’s Queer Feminist Sexual Politics,”
- HBO’s Girls and the White Box theme week, In Media Res, Jan. 7, 2013.
- “Enlightened or Not?: How HBO Learned to Trust Its Viewers But Not Its Shows,” Save Our Shows theme week [co-curator], In Media Res, May 14–18, 2012.
- “Ultimate Surrender: Lesbian Porn Not Just for Straight Sport,” Sex and the Internet theme week, In Media Res, February 15, 2011.

=== Videographic criticism ===
- “The Close-Up in Call Me by Your Name”
