= Jackie Wang =

American poet and academic

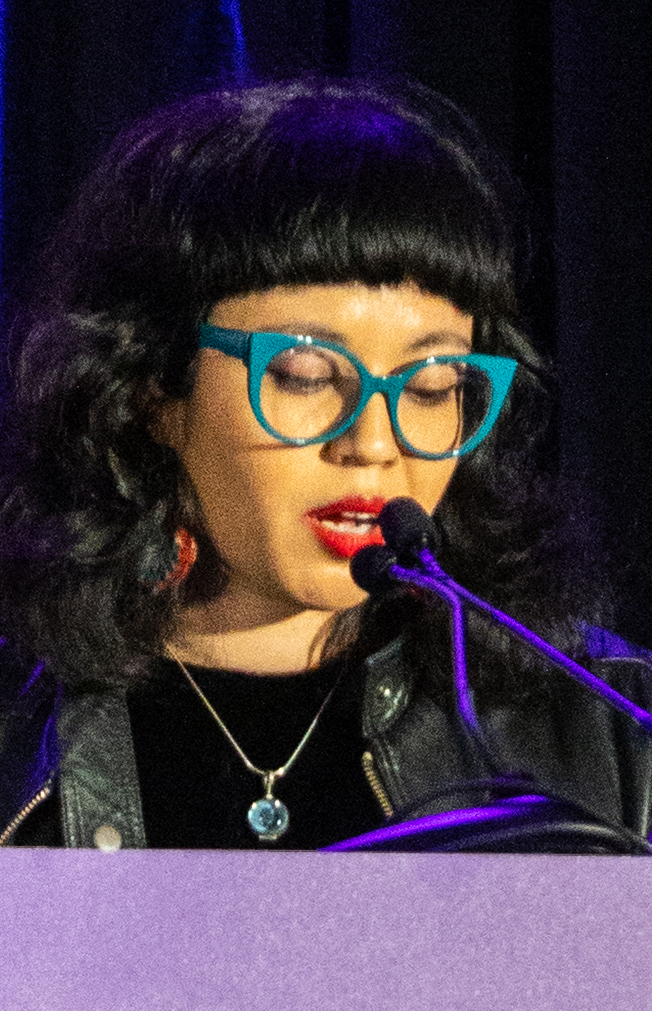
- Wang at AWP 2025
- Born: New Port Richey, Florida, U.S.

Academic background
- Education: New College of Florida (BA); Harvard University (MA, PhD)
- Doctoral advisor: Elizabeth Hinton

Academic work
- Discipline: American studies and ethnicity
- Institutions: Brown University; University of Southern California
- Website: https://literaryarts.brown.edu/people/jackie-wang

Jackie Wang is an American professor, author, and poet. She is best known for her books Carceral Capitalism, which critiques the relationship between the debt economy and racialized mass incarceration, and The Sunflower Cast a Spell to Save Us from the Void, for which she was a National Book Award finalist in poetry in 2021. Her scholarship centers on the intersections of racism, liberal capitalism, surveillance technologies, and the political economy of prisons.

== Early life and education ==
Jackie Wang grew up in New Port Richey, Florida. Her brother was incarcerated when she was 16. While in Florida she worked a number of minimum wage jobs, including as a hotel receptionist, and during this time Wang witnessed firsthand the class divisions in Florida which had been heavily exacerbated by the 2008 financial crisis.

Wang received a B.A. in Liberal arts from the New College of Florida in 2010. Later, Wang completed both an M.A. and Ph.D. in African and African American Studies at Harvard University in 2018 and 2020 respectively. Her Ph.D. advisor was Elizabeth Hinton.

Wang is biracial, with one parent from China and great-grandparents from Sicily. She is also a harpist.

== Career ==
Wang is an assistant professor of Literary Arts at Brown University. She is a prison abolitionist.

=== Writing ===
As a PhD candidate, Wang published her first nonfiction book, Carceral Capitalism, which examines the neoliberal, capitalist incentives to use prisons and other systems of incarceration to manage crisis, specifically with a focus on how race influences these processes. She considers topics including municipal finance, debt economies, and the concept of innocence in her analyses, combining both poetry and autobiography into passages. In an interview with Tank Magazine, she noted "I wasn’t simply positing mass incarceration as an effect of the economy, but I wanted to think about the relationship between what’s happening in the economic sphere and the carceral sphere. I also wanted to bridge two different ways of looking at anti-black racism." Her analysis in Carceral Capitalism has been compared to the work of Ruth Wilson Gilmore.

Her first full-length poetry collection The Sunflower Cast a Spell to Save Us from the Void was a finalist for the 2021 National Book Award for Poetry and the 2022 Lambda Literary Award for Bisexual Poetry. As with others works by Wang, the collection is focused on dreams and dreaming, taking her own dreams as inspiration. A reviewer for The Nation noted, “If there is a formula to what she does throughout the course of this book, it is taking us out of our world and then placing us back in it, changed.”

Her 2023 autobiographical book - Alien Daughters Walk Into the Sun: An Encyclopedia of Extreme Girlhood - is a collection of Wang's writing from sources including blog posts in the early 2000s and zines.

== Carceral Capitalism ==
In 2018 Wang published Carceral Capitalism, a book critiquing the relationship between capitalism and the American criminal justice system from a left-wing perspective. Throughout the book, Wang used historical analysis, case studies and personal reflections to argue that the American criminal justice system disproportionately targets black and other nonwhite people for fines, legal fees, and incarceration. According to Wang, this process is informed by historical racism, structural racism (Note: "A politics of innocence is only capable of acknowledging examples of direct, individualized acts of racist violence while obscuring the racism of a putatively color-blind liberalism that operates on a structural level.") and public finance at the municipal or "city/town" level, with the outcome that American black and nonwhite people experience lower quality of life. Wang specifically draws from Cedric Robinson's concept of racial capitalism as well as Afro-pessimism to explain both the motivations for incarceration and the nature of violence and punishment. Wang cited the Flint water crisis as an example of public financial decision-making which had disastrous effects on a predominantly black community:

Flint was facing a fiscal crisis. In 2014, to cut costs, the city switched its water source from Detroit's Lake Huron system to the Flint River. Officials–including the emergency financial managers–did this knowing that the city did not have the infrastructure to properly treat the water. The untreated water corroded the pipes, and high levels of lead leaked into the water, poisoning the primarily black residents of the city... As dry and technical and boring as the topic of municipal finance and fiscal retrenchment is, we see in the case of the Flint water crisis that these matters form the invisible backdrop of our lives: they directly determine our quality of life and even our health outcomes.

In 2014 Darren Wilson–a white police officer–shot and killed Michael Brown–a young black man–in Ferguson, Missouri, a suburb of St. Louis. The shooting sparked demonstrations and civil unrest. Wang took the shooting and its aftermath as one of her case studies, examining the historical background informing the event. Wang cited a U.S. Justice Department report compiled after the shooting to note that the Ferguson Police Department's practices stressed revenue collection for the city government via citations, to the detriment of its broader aim of promoting public safety. This emphasis on revenue collection was in response to the 2008 financial crisis, among other economic factors. According to Wang, this practice gave rise to a culture in which some residents who failed to pay off citations for minor infractions then became subject to arrest warrants, limiting their freedom of movement. Wang noted that these factors gave rise to an unlivable environment which–together with the destruction of makeshift memorials for Brown's death, both in the immediate aftermath and in later months–motivated the civil unrest following his shooting.

Wang also examined the American practice of Juvenile Life Without Parole (JLWOP) sentencing, which she connected to the "Superpredator" theory, posited by John J. DiIulio Jr. and popularized in the American political discourse of the 1990s by Bill and Hillary Clinton. Writing in 1995, DiIulio predicted that youth crime was about to rise dramatically, especially among urban black boys. He based this prediction on population growth trends and also on "moral poverty", experienced by children who are socialized in abusive households lacking adults who teach basic moral instruction (right from wrong), among other factors. With this background, Wang noted that in the 1990s several American states passed laws making it possible for children (or: adolescents) to be tried as adults for certain crimes, with the further possibility that they might be sentenced to life without parole, thus blurring the line between minors and adults as legal persons. Wang also gave a personal example, noting that her older brother Randy received a JLWOP sentence for a crime that was committed in 2004, when he was seventeen. Although Wang provided several details about her brother's case in the book, she did not specify what he was convicted of. In one reviewer's words, the details concerning the crimes themselves were "not important." In 2005, Randy was convicted of second-degree murder and other charges in connection with a drug deal which went awry; the judge was Joseph Bulone, and the prosecutor was Mike Halkitis. Randy argued self-defense both in the original trial, and in a later resentencing hearing.

In a later chapter Wang gave a critique of innocence, specifically its role in determining which victims are deserving of sympathy, and which are not. Wang began with an anecdote about a boy who was killed by staff in a juvenile facility, noting that because he was identified as an "offender", all online comments in the article about his killing were "crude and contemptuous", and he was judged "not worthy of sympathy". Wang then considered what sets this example apart from the killing of Trayvon Martin and other events which did elicit public outcry. In the context of American media reporting on victimization, Wang identified several criteria associated with innocence which are needed in order for the public to deem a victim worthy of sympathy. In order for a victim to be worthy of sympathy, they must be perceived as innocent, where innocence means both "an appeal to the white imaginary" and also a person perceived as "nonthreatening to white civil society". It is also helpful if the incident occurs in a place such that white people can easily imagine themselves in that place, as in the case of Trayvon Martin (a townhome or gated community, as opposed to a ghetto). It is also helpful if the incident and the nature of the wrong done can easily be explained to a broad audience. According to Wang, the basic problems with innocence as a paradigm are that it makes victimization comprehensible only if one is able to imagine oneself as the victim, and that it tends to focus on individual tragedies, whereas structural racism is large-scale and policy-based. Criminals are also capable of being victims, and their victimization may be indicative of the larger-scale structural problems discussed by Wang.

== Against Innocence – Race, Gender, and the Politics of Safety ==
In 2012, Jackie Wang published Against Innocence: Race, Gender, and the Politics of Safety, a text critiquing the requirement to appeal to the innocence of victims of state violence in order for them to be treated with dignity and empathy. This essay also appears in Carceral Capitalism.

Wang writes that within the framework of innocence, a person must necessarily meet the standards of moral purity and authentic victimhood in order to be treated with empathy. The author argues that this translates into a need for Black people to passively sacrifice themselves to meet these standards. In this way, this paradigm of innocence thus requires a perfect, whitewashed, neutralized and non-threatening victim in order for this victim to gain any sort of social, political, cultural or legal recognition. Thus, Wang explains that many forms of racist state violence are overlooked in this paradigm, such as racialized patterns of incarceration and the attacks on the urban poor. Consequently, this racist state violence is not scrutinized if we stay within the boundaries of what is morally deemed worthy in the framework of innocence.

Wang describes criminality, in the paradigm of innocence, as binary: a person is either innocent or guilty. She argues that this discourse of moral impurity associated with guilt and criminality is racially charged. Therefore, the guilt-innocence schematization creates an amalgam between guilt and blackness, because being black is a societal signifier of guilt. Wang's thesis is that the enemies of state peace, the “criminals”, are first are foremost defined by their race, gender and class. According to Wang's framework of innocence, the guilty as defined by the state, i.e. the criminals, should not be heard, which fosters a culture of vilification of convicts and those around them. The author writes that deviating from the norm does not entitle one to dignified treatment. Therefore, it results in the exclusion of any form of resistance outside the boundaries of legality, further controlling the oppressed.

According to Wang, the paradigm of innocence leads to a model that consists in isolating specific exemplary cases that fit the norms of moral purity and legitimate victimhood, i.e. a spokesperson model of activism, in order to address racist state violence. The author states that the politics of innocence, by focusing on the spokesperson model, which emphasizes the situation of an individual, fails to address systemic racism and violence, and obscures the collective nature of these harms. Wang argues that, in the spokesperson model, innocence becomes a necessary precondition to campaign against racist state violence. Wang exemplifies this idea by writing that if the innocence of a Black victim is not established, they cannot be an appropriate spokesperson to talk about the violence they endured. Moreover, she highlights that framing oppression as individual is a liberal tactic to destroy collective responses to oppression.

Furthermore, Wang explains that within the paradigm of innocence, ethical or moral questions about violence are often raised. In this way, questioning the morality of violence is a tactic which prevents the oppressed from resorting to violence, thereby undermining their liberation. Wang states that it is also used to control the question of who can use "legitimate" violence. She argues that this paradigm is also a tool for controlling activities that diverges from a model of nonviolent resistance and advocates for docile citizen activism.

== Bibliography ==
=== Poetry ===
==== Collections ====
- The Sunflower Cast a Spell to Save Us from the Void, Nightboat Books, 2021. ISBN 9781643620367

==== Chapbooks ====
- Tiny Spelunker of the Oneiro-Womb (published in collection Say Bye to Reason and Hi to Everything edited by Andrew Durbin), Capricious, 2016. ISBN 9780997444605
- Curated by Tamryn Spruill, The Twitter Hive Mind is Dreaming, Robocup Press. 2018 ISBN 9781388878153

=== Non-fiction ===
- Wang, Jackie (2018). Carceral Capitalism. Semiotext(e) Intervention Series. Vol. 21. Semiotext(e). ISBN 9781635900026.
- Contributor, Technoprecarious, MIT Press, 2020. ISBN 9781912685981
- Alien Daughters Walk Into the Sun: An Almanac of Extreme Girlhood, Semiotext(e)/Native Agents, 2023. ISBN 9781635901924
