= The Uncommon Sense of the Immortal Mullah Nasruddin =

2010 book by Ron Suresha

- Author: Ron Suresha
- Language: English
- Subject: Nasreddin
- Genre: Folklore
- Publisher: Lethe Press
- Publication date: 2010

The Uncommon Sense of the Immortal Mullah Nasruddin is the title of a 2010 book of folkloric stories collected and retold by Ron Suresha, published by Lethe Press, about the folk character Nasreddin. Suresha subtitled the book, Stories, jests, and donkey tales of the beloved Persian folk hero.

Suresha states in the acknowledgments that he researched the book in part at the Connecticut Storytelling Center in New London, Connecticut, where he lived at the time; the center's director, Ann Shapiro, wrote the preface.

The book is divided into seven parts, each having seven sections, each with seven stories, according to a tradition that one must tell seven Nasreddin stories at a sitting. It includes a glossary and bibliography.

The book was named a Storytelling World Honor Title in 2012 in the adult storytelling collections category. It was also selected for a 2013 Anne Izard Storytellers' Choice Award.

In 2013, the book was made into an Audible audiotape narrated by Ted Brooks.

In 2017, Suresha published a new edition of the book with his own imprint, Bear Bones Books, ISBN 978-1-98116-277-2.
