= Sympathy for Wild Girls =

2025 short story collection by Demree McGhee

- First edition cover
- Author: Demree McGhee
- Publisher: Feminist Press
- Publication date: May 6, 2025
- Pages: 212
- Award: Lambda Literary Award for Bisexual Literature (2026)
- ISBN: 978-1-558-61338-6

Sympathy for Wild Girls is the debut short story collection of Demree McGhee, published by Feminist Press in May 2025. The collection was well received by critics and won the 2026 Lambda Literary Award for Bisexual Literature.

== Contents ==
Sympathy for Wild Girls consists of 15 short stories about Black, queer girls and women.

== Themes ==
The stories included in Sympathy for Wild Girls address various themes, including "Blackness, queer identity, race and class divides, body image, friendship, [and] feminism". Other themes include "intimate connections, grief, self-acceptance, hope, faith, restlessness, transformation, and desire". Stories also discuss coming-of-age, particularly as a Black, queer woman.

== Writing style ==
Sympathy for Wild Girls utilizes a non-traditional writing style. As Kirkus Reviews wrote, "Readers looking for traditional short stories might find themselves vexed", given that "the pieces aren't incomplete, but rather fragmented". Allison Escoto, writing for Booklist, further noted that "McGhee writes in between the real and surreal, mixing dreamlike elements with stark realism, striking a balance that infuses each story with inventive and effective storytelling".

The stories are feminist in nature and use magical realism.

== Reception ==
Sympathy for Wild Girls was well received by critics, including starred reviews from the Independent Book Review.

Sympathy for Wild Girls and the stories within have been called "daring", "enigmatic", "enticing", "off-kilter", "accomplished", "visceral", "unique and compelling". Publishers Weekly applauded how, in each story, "McGhee commits to a deep exploration of physical, emotional, and sexual desire".

Many critics discussed McGhee's writing style. Gianni Washington, writing for the Chicago Review of Books, described McGhee's writing style as "confident and poetic, leaning often into the realm of fairytale". Kirkus Reviews added, "There is ample craft here, cunning description as well as an urgent, evocative voice that demands attention. McGhee harnesses the magic of language and narrative and character into a new kind of vessel to hold what it feels like to be young and Black and queer," noting that each story "takes unexpected risks". Speaking specifically to the book's fragmented story endings, the Independent Book Review wrote,

Sometimes McGhee hits these poetic and thought-provoking endings that feel wholly satisfying, while other stories are concluded midway through their unraveling—when things are about to turn inside out and collapse. It's like someone closing the door on us right as the conversation we're eavesdropping on gets really juicy. They are not necessarily abrupt endings that leave the stories feeling unfinished but ones that leave the reader with meaning instead of resolution. Even this is testament to McGhee's immersive writing, because each time this happens, I sat for a few minutes with all the possibilities I was sure would happen next, imagining all the ways the protagonist would mess it up or get into trouble. I always wanted more.

Danika Ellis, writing for The Lesbrary, called Sympathy for Wild Girls "a must read for fans of Carmen Maria Machado", given the work's feminist underpinnings and use of magical realism.

Sympathy for Wild Girls won the 2026 Lambda Literary Award for Bisexual Literature.
