= Habibi City =

2026 New York magazine article by Zaina Arafat

"Habibi City" is a 2026 magazine article by Palestinian American writer Zaina Arafat, published by New York as part of a package about Southwest Asian and North African (SWANA) culture in New York City.

The article and accompanying package attracted controversy over their treatment of Zionism, Israel and Jewish identity.

== Background and content ==
She describes New York-based Arab and Muslim communities as becoming more culturally cohesive since the September 11 attacks, with increased cohesion in the 2020s. She identified protests against Donald Trump's 2017 travel ban and Ramy Youssef's TV series Ramy as contributing to greater solidarity and visibility of SWANA people.

The title uses habibi, an Arabic term of affection meaning "my beloved" or "my dear". L'Orient Today contrasted "Habibi City" with a in 1975 New York magazine piece which examined whether the city's growing Arab communities could successfully establish themselves there, and saw the 2026 "Habibi City" issue as a symbolic answer to that question.

Arafat describes a network of restaurants, cafés, bookstores, reading groups, musical events and parties serving people of SWANA backgrounds. She argues that political organizing and fundraising following the October 7 attacks and subsequent Gaza war helped strengthen these networks. She characterizes the milieu as broadly progressive and pro-Palestine while noting disagreements over national, ethnic and religious identity, including debate over the place of Israelis within the SWANA category.

== Publication and reception ==
"Habibi City" was the centerpiece of a broader New York package covering food, nightlife, comedy and figures in the city's SWANA cultural scene.

Criticism focused on the package's treatment of Israel, Zionism and Jewish identity. Arafat's inclusion of Zionism as a prejudice faced by SWANA New Yorkers, alongside xenophobia and Islamophobia, drew criticism, as did what critics regarded as inadequate representation of Jews of SWANA origin. An accompanying food article by Madeline Leung Coleman, "When eating out is political", was also criticized for describing Israel as "the land mass currently called Israel".

Israeli journalist Liel Leibovitz criticized the article in The Free Press, arguing that the article encouraged ethnic and political separation rather than assimilation into a common American identity. New York responded that the package sought to document an increasingly visible subculture and acknowledged criticism from members of the Jewish community, while saying it had attempted to portray political disagreements within the communities covered.

== See also ==
- Culture of New York City
