= The Sunflower Cast a Spell to Save Us from the Void =

2021 debut poetry collection by Jackie Wang

- Author: Jackie Wang
- Publisher: Nightboat Books
- Publication date: February 2, 2021
- Pages: 120
- ISBN: 978-1643620367
- Preceded by: Carceral Capitalism
- Followed by: Alien Daughters Walk Into the Sun: An Almanac of Extreme Girlhood

The Sunflower Cast a Spell to Save Us from the Void is a 2021 debut poetry collection by Jackie Wang, published by Nightboat Books. It was a finalist for the 2021 National Book Award for Poetry and the 2022 Lambda Literary Award for Bisexual Poetry.

== Content ==
The book's poems, through the use of dream settings, speculatively address social themes like solidarity politics, structural violence, and intergenerational trauma. The book also includes drawings by Kalan Sherrard, as well as film stills from movies like The Sacrifice by Andrei Tarkovsky.

== Critical reception ==
In a starred review, Publishers Weekly called the book an "extraordinary debut" and likened its style to Mei-mei Berssenbrugge and Marosa di Giorgio.

Many critics observed the dreamy quality of the book. The Los Angeles Review of Books stated that "Wang's poems center on the sociality of dreams, not only the shattering tenderness of being with others, but also dreaming as a response to endless crisis: techno-dystopian surveillance, policing and prisons, the threat of climate change and total war, supercharged diseases, the brutal exhaustions of racial capitalism." RHINO said: "Well-versed by her studies of capitalism, race, and prison abolition, and her own experiences of trauma, Wang leads us through the searing plots of her dreams with exactness and mysticism, like Simone Weil, her psyche’s resident French philosopher." Of Wang's dreamy poems, Porter House Review wrote that "In each sequence, trauma and hopefulness intertwine to deliver a better understanding of our reality. Her experiences are told through political, survival, and personal episodes that combine in search of a place for recovery." Vagabond City opined that "Wang lends credence to the value of dreams in a way that few seem to, and what is often dismissed with a wave of the hand is held in a gentle spotlight here."

Electric Literature called the book one of its favorite poetry collections of 2021. Time listed it in one of their 100 must-read books for 2021, stating "Wang’s experiments with form, style and structure will change the way you see your dreams—and poetry—forever."
