= Nicole Kristal =

American writer

- Education: University of Oregon
- Occupation: Author

Nicole Kristal is a script coordinator and founder of the #StillBisexual campaign. She is the coauthor with Mike Szymanski of The Bisexual's Guide to the Universe, which received the Lambda Literary Award for Bisexual Literature in 2006.
