= Andrea Lawlor =

21st-century American novelist

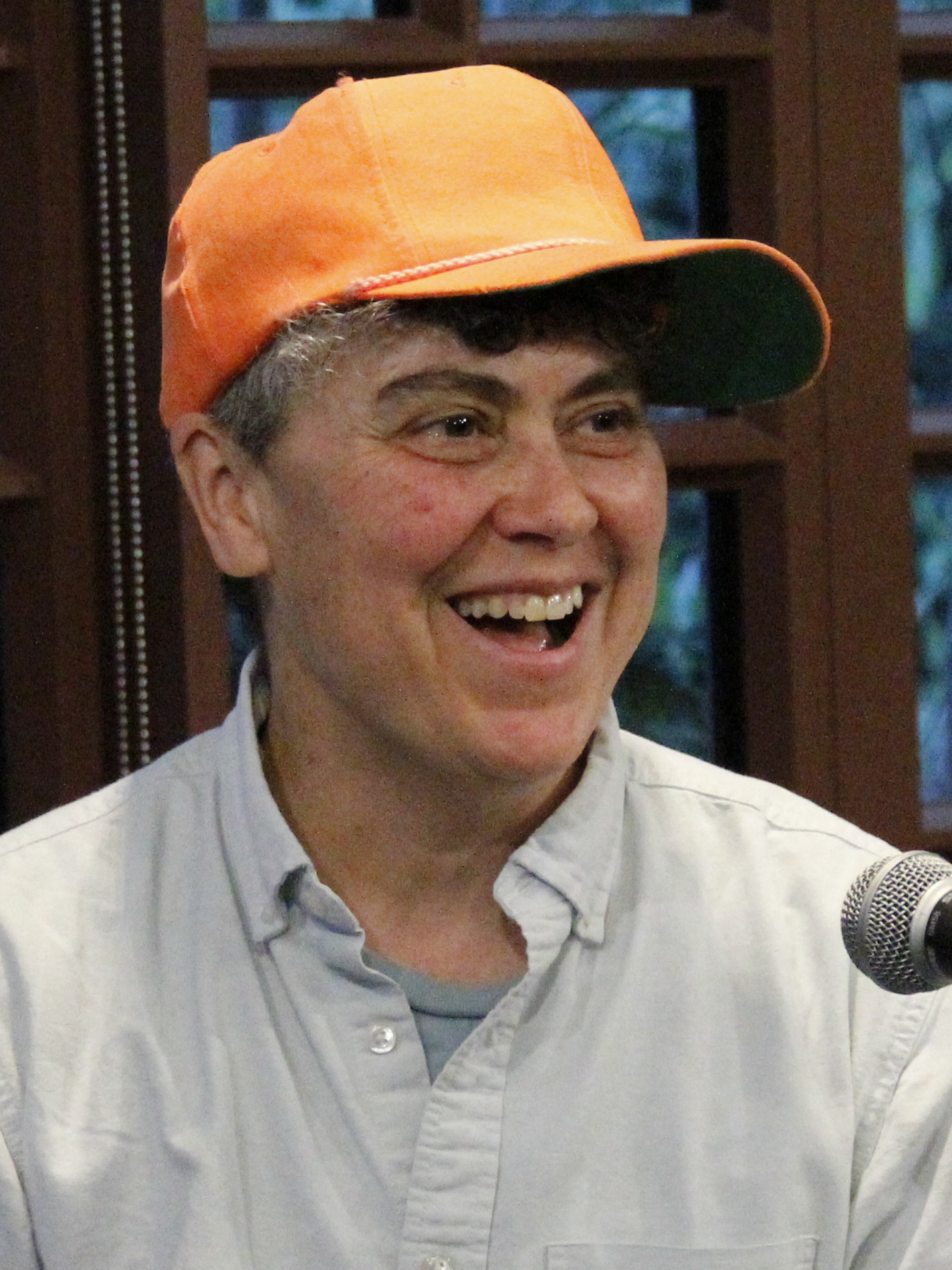
- Lawlor in 2025
- Education: Fordham University
- Occupation: Author
- Partner: Bernardine Mellis
- Children: 1
- Writing career
- Notable awards: Whiting Award (2020)
- Website: www.anderlawlor.com

Andrea Lawlor is an American author and winner of the 2020 Whiting Award for Fiction for their novel Paul Takes the Form of a Mortal Girl.

== Early life and education ==
Lawlor attended Fordham University in the early 1990s, where they involved themself in activism, including starting the first lesbian and gay group on campus, for which they and their friends received death threats, and joining the Pink Panthers, which patrolled the Village and protected LGBT people from homophobic attacks. They were a member of ACT UP and lost friends to AIDS. They said it was through this kind of "radical organising" that they "really ... came into queer life".

== Career ==
Lawlor began writing at the age of 30 and took 15 years to complete their debut novel Paul Takes the Form of a Mortal Girl. The novel, when first published by Rescue Press, was a finalist for both a Lambda Literary Award for Bisexual Literature and a CLMP Firecracker Award in 2018, and won the 2020 Whiting Award for Fiction following republication by Penguin Random House.

Lawlor teaches writing at Mount Holyoke College in South Hadley, Massachusetts, and is a fiction editor for Fence.

== Personal life ==
Lawlor is non-binary and uses they/them pronouns. They live in Massachusetts with their partner, filmmaker Bernadine Mellis, and their child. Lawlor's best friend, Jordy Rosenberg, author of Confessions of the Fox, lives with the family.
