= Paul Takes the Form of a Mortal Girl =

Novel by Andrea Lawlor

- Author: Andrea Lawlor
- Genre: Picaresque novel; Magical realism
- Set in: United States, 1993
- Published: 2017 (Rescue Press); 2019 (Vintage Books)
- Publication place: United States
- Pages: 388
- Awards: Whiting Award
- ISBN: 0-525-56618-X
- Website: https://www.anderlawlor.com/paul

Paul Takes the Form of a Mortal Girl is a novel by American writer Andrea Lawlor. It was published in 2017 by Rescue Press. The book is heavily influenced by the queer culture of the 1990s, and took Lawlor 15 years to write.

The picaresque novel follows Paul, a 23-year-old who discovers that he can shapeshift and uses this ability to alter his gender expression while wandering the United States. He is a flâneur who enjoys wearing performative outfits and seeks out various sexual experiences with a diverse assortment of partners; his gender identity is never made explicit. Set in 1993, the novel takes place in various locations where the author has lived. The text exhibits postmodern influences, using footnotes and pastiche, with short fables interspersed throughout.

Paul Takes the Form of a Mortal Girl is Andrea Lawlor's debut novel. The book received positive reviews, with reviewers praising its novel approach to gender and sex as well as its innovative structure and period accuracy. It was republished by Vintage Books in 2019, and Lawlor received a Whiting Award for the book.

== Background ==
Writer Andrea Lawlor was involved with queer activism as an undergraduate in the 1990s, founding the first lesbian and gay group at Fordham University. They began writing Paul Takes the Form of a Mortal Girl in San Francisco when they were 30 years old. They had just quit a corporate job and began exploring creative writing while working at a bookstore, taking a night class at Gotham Writers' Workshop. The first draft of Paul began as a retelling of the Tiresias myth. The concept was also influenced by Orlando: A Biography, which Lawlor read in high school "because it was on a list of books with something queer in them". Ovid's Metamorphoses and Wild Seed were additional influences.

Lawlor later enrolled in a creative writing graduate program taught by Samuel R. Delany at Temple University, and turned in the draft; Delany encouraged them to continue working on the story. Lawlor completed the first draft of the novel while in the Master of Fine Arts program at the University of Massachusetts. They worked on the novel while enrolled in graduate classes, teaching, working, and caring for a baby with their partner. The novel took 15 years to complete.

"I tried outlining, tried to understand three-act structure, tried to impose a plot, but kept coming back to my sense that I just needed to follow Paul, that my structure was going to have to be a little queer as well."

— Andrea Lawlor, 2018

According to Lawlor, the draft was initially rejected by various publishers because they did not think it had enough plot or conflict. Lawlor refused to make protagonist Paul learn a lesson in the text, believing that conventional plot structure would make the novel unrealistic.

Lawlor is close friends with Jordy Rosenberg, author of the queer novel Confessions of the Fox; Rosenberg lives with Lawlor's family. The two authors' novels were among the first by transgender or non-binary authors to be picked up by major publishing houses.

=== Publication ===
Rescue Press published Paul Takes the Form of a Mortal Girl with an initial run of 500 copies in November 2017. It was Lawlor's debut novel. Despite the limited initial printing, the novel was reviewed in the "Briefly Noted" section of The New Yorker, which Lawlor said prompted widespread interest in the book as well as potential film rights. (The book was optioned by Ryan Murphy.) Lawlor was subsequently able to begin working with literary agent PJ Mark, who negotiated a deal for broader publication with Vintage Books.

Vintage Books reprinted Paul Takes the Form of a Mortal Girl in 2019. According to Lawlor, half of the profits from the reprint go to Rescue Press in perpetuity. Picador published Paul in Britain and Australia in 2019.

== Content ==
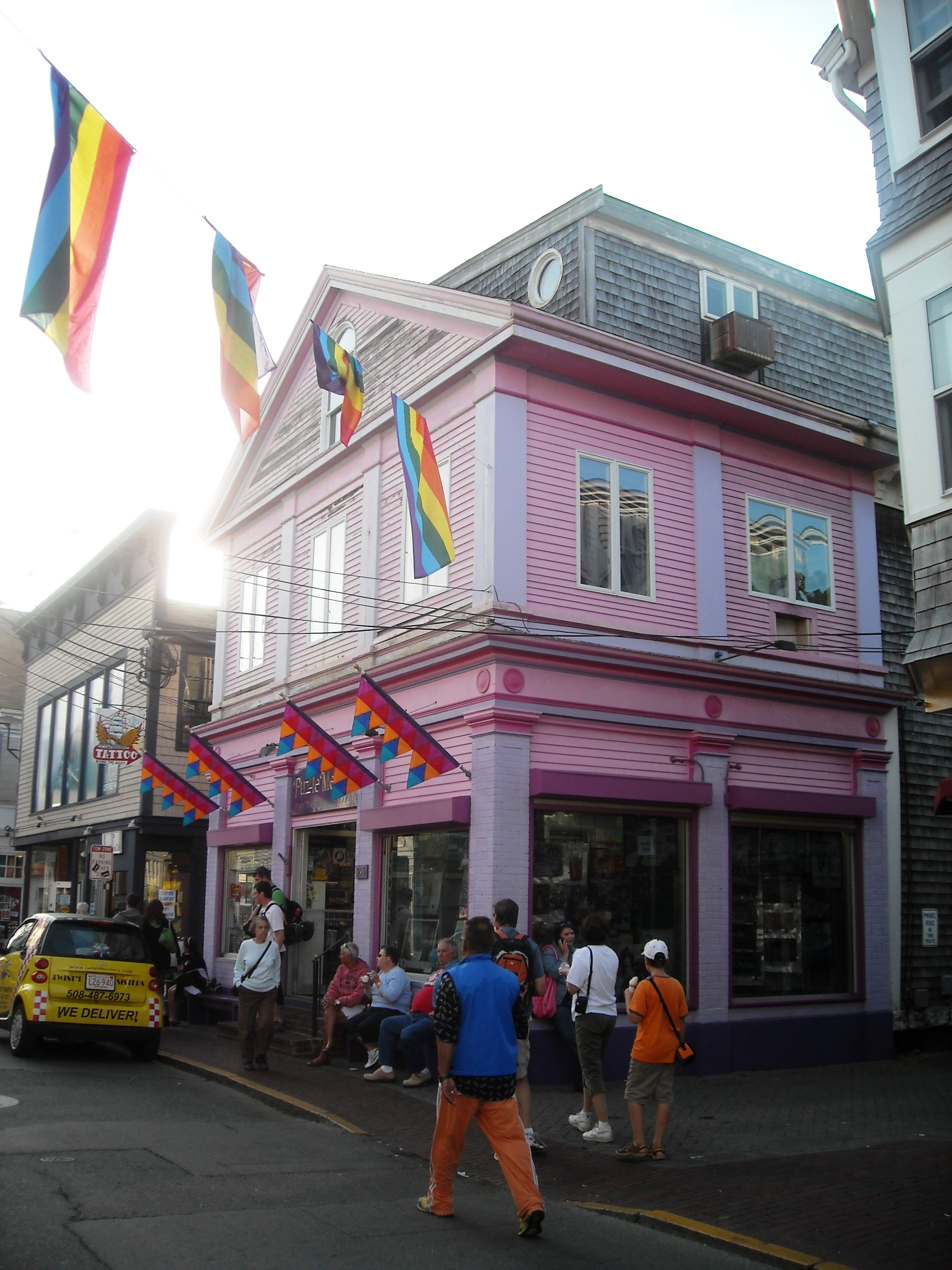
A portion of the novel takes place in Provincetown, Massachusetts

Paul Takes the Form of a Mortal Girl is set in 1993, and its content is heavily influenced by the queer culture of the 1990s. The novel's protagonist, 23-year-old Paul Polydoris, is a student and bartender who discovers that he is secretly capable of shapeshifting. He uses this ability to change his gender expression, sometimes for sexual purposes, while adventuring across the United States and avoiding voicemails from his first love who has been diagnosed with HIV/AIDS. Settings include the punk subculture of Iowa City, the Michigan Womyn's Music Festival, Provincetown, Massachusetts in the off-season, and a leather bar backroom in Chicago. All these settings are in places the author has lived.

"Call anybody Paul and they get to be a Paul."

— Gertrude Stein, as quoted in the epigraph of Paul Takes the Form of a Mortal Girl

Paul Polydoris conceives of himself as Paul and uses the masculine pronoun for himself throughout the narrative, although his gender identity is never explicit to him or the reader. He is characterized, and characterizes himself, as a flâneur who is gratified by wearing performative outfits and seeking out various sexual experiences; he is able to "make himself be attracted to anyone". He is also able to change his body and his genitalia, and does so often. His ethnicity is similarly ambiguous, although less under his control.

At the beginning of the novel, Paul is studying film studies in Iowa City. The novel opens with him shapeshifting his body to have breasts and a vagina, dressing in feminine clothing, and going out to a bar while looking like "the girl he wanted to fuck". At the bar, his friend Jane believes he is in costume and is impressed by how realistically female he looks. He later becomes a muscular bottom at a leather bar while traveling to Chicago so he can "see what leather guys [do] with other leather guys," and takes on the appearance of a girl in a miniskirt to experience the sex lives of "normal straight people". All of these identities are temporary for him.

Later in the novel he spends an extended period as a femme lesbian named Polly. He goes to the Michigan Womyn's Music Festival with Jane and meets a woman named Diane; Diane and Polly have sex in the woods and begin a committed lesbian relationship. When Jane later reveals Paul's history and shapeshifting ability to Diane, she is initially angry and accusing him of lying. He responds that he is not a man, and doesn't know what he is; the two reconcile after Diane tells him that "you smell like a girl all the time" and that she believes he is truly female. Paul goes to Provincetown with Diane, where he finds that his experiences and feelings are shaped by being a girl. When Diane breaks his heart, he becomes a man once again and travels to San Francisco, continuing to seek out sexual experiences including giving an outdoor blowjob to a "dirty hippie". He learns that his first boyfriend has died of AIDS, has a short-lived gay relationship, and meets another person who can shapeshift like him; this person becomes his friend and rejects his romantic advances. The novel closes with Paul walking through San Francisco, which he describes as a city as "various as himself".

Paul Takes the Form of a Mortal Girl is a picaresque novel with short, relevant fables interspersed throughout. Devices from postmodern literature such as footnotes and pastiche are present in the text. Magical realism is also incorporated. Cultural and academic figures from the period are mentioned in the text as well, including theorists Lauren Berlant, Leo Bersani, and Judith Butler as well as others like Rainer Werner Fassbinder, Jean Genet, and Jeanne Moreau. Cultural works mentioned include Orlando, The Well of Loneliness, and Giovanni's Room. Lawlor has described the novel as "thinly veiled autobiography" but also stated that "at the end of the day, I'm not Paul and Paul is not me".

== Reception ==
=== Reviews ===
A review in the "Briefly Noted" section of The New Yorker found Paul Takes the Form of a Mortal Girl to be a successful combination of "pop culture, gender theory, and smut", and praised the realistic way protagonist Paul is written. The Guardian praised the book for its period accuracy as well as its well-written depictions of sex. The review argued that the book's "unapologetically queer" nature should not hinder its mainstream success, describing Lawlor's writing as "evocative and urgent". Another mention of Paul in The Guardian characterized the novel as "a picaresque romp". The Irish Times praised the book as "a celebration of being young and queer," and contrasted it with the bildungsroman and künstlerroman genres while noting that it differs from these forms in its avoidance of an enlightened resolution: "the 'journeying' that Paul takes is not so much one of enlightenment or greater knowledge, but through different queer communities, different forms of sexual and intimate relationships, and the myriad possibilities of his shapeshifting form".

The Saturday Paper described protagonist Paul as "an enfant terrible with heart", and the novel as "a sassy read, skilfully balancing humour with pathos". A review in Vice focused specifically on the role of music in Paul Takes the Form of a Mortal Girl, praising Lawlor's accuracy and attention to detail in selecting songs and artists to mention. The Skinny found that the novel "manages to define queerness in a way few books have been able to achieve", with the reviewer expressing gratitude for its status as "a book about a queer body that is a source of pleasure, rather than one of self-hatred, to be pitied or condemned".

In the London Review of Books, a review by Elisa Gabbert stated that "the novel seems to look at the camera and wink" as its complexity develops, and noted that Paul Takes the Form of a Mortal Girl ends in medias res. In the Sydney Review of Books, Greta LaFleur wrote that the novel is "both about trans experience and a vision of trans experience that is not yet, but could be [...] a potential that exists on psychic, social, physical, and cultural levels for all of us". The Los Angeles Review of Books described Paul as an exciting character, praised the novel's "gritty and uninhibited sexuality", and concluded that "Lawlor has written an intoxicatingly rousing masterpiece". The White Review reviewed Paul as "fun, and frequently hilarious", with Juliet Jacques writing that the novel "short-circuits not just the established transition narrative, but also the need that many trans and non-binary people feel to clarify their identities, and have them understood by others." Jacques concluded that the book is effective and innovative. Rain Taxi also praised the text in a review that noted its "warm tone and livewire voice" and its "nuanced treatment of a conceit that could easily yield to gimmick or cliché", concluding that "Lawlor is a magician, and a very good one".

A starred review in Kirkus Reviews found Paul Takes the Form of a Mortal Girl to be "groundbreaking, shape- and genre-shifting work from a daring writer", and described the narrative as "magical, sexual, and hopeful" with "taut, self-aware, and carnal" prose. Booklist reviewed the novel as "a coming-of-age fairy tale without the easy moral, a mix of comedy and tenderness and backroom sexual exploits", and praised the author's use of genre. In Bookforum, Brian Blanchfield described the premise of Paul as "genius", and argued that Lawlor's writing style exploits readers' expectations to make the reader "part of the project". A starred review in Foreword Reviews described the book as "a hilarious, original, gender-fluid novel replete with 1990s cachet, sex, and queer identity" that "introduces hefty topics in a highly entertaining, fresh, and thought-provoking way", praising it as an impressive debut novel and "a new benchmark for gender-nonconforming literature".

Maggie Nelson praised the sex scenes in Paul Takes the Form of a Mortal Girl as "HOT". A Lambda Literary Foundation review stated that "Andrea Lawlor has coolly escorted sex back into conversations about gender, which have long been unmoored from fucking in the name of mainstream didactics and respectability", praising the novel as "an intelligent and dashing work ". The F-Word published a review describing Lawlor as "a brilliantly astute writer" and stating that Paul "reads like a cult classic from the beginning".

=== Awards and lists ===
Lawlor received a Whiting Award for Paul Takes the Form of a Mortal Girl. The book was a finalist for the CLMP Firecracker Awards and the Lambda Literary Award for Bisexual Literature in 2018.

Carmen Maria Machado selected Paul for her "A Year in Reading" list in 2017, praising it as a "sexy, picaresque" novel. In 2018, R. L. Goldberg included it in their list "Toward Creating a Trans Literary Canon" in The Paris Review. In 2019, Dazed listed the book among "11 new LGBTQ books to read", Tor.com included it on a list of "Our Favorite LGBTQ+ Reads of the Past Year", and Oprah Daily listed it among the best LGBTQ books of the year.

=== Academic analysis ===
A Feminist Formations article asserted that Paul's "gender processes" in the novel "complicate the nature/culture binary", which the article's author described as "a crucial project from a queer ecological/ecofeminist perspective, given that the culture/nature binary supports degradation of both the Earth and marginalized people". The article compared the phenomenon of Paul's identity in the novel to concepts from the work of Gaston Bachelard (topophilia and The Poetics of Space) and contrasted it with the work of Judith Butler (Gender Trouble). It explores the presence of magical realism in the text, arguing that "the literary category of 'magical realism' that might otherwise contain the metamorphoses in this novel becomes inadequate since there is no stable ground of gender, no actual mundane, against which the 'magical' or the 'real' would be defined". The article concludes that "in his ardent receptivity to life, [Paul] offers to the reader a vision of boundless appreciation for the liminal, magical naturecultures of queer spaces and subcultural movements in American history".

In Studies in the Novel, Paul Takes the Form of a Mortal Girl was included in a review of five contemporary novels by transgender authors. The review noted the distinct avoidance of linear progressions in Paul, stating that "the novel invokes a wish for pluralizing and easily embodying genders—what it does away with is the notion that permanence and direction are suited to everyone" and that "not much progress occurs for Paul" in the course of the narrative. It characterized the novel as picaresque for its "undermining of linearity and resolution [...] erratic and socially marginal protagonist [...] and the episodic nature of the narrative occasioned by repeated scene-fleeing", but argued against James Mandrell's description of the picaresque as inherently conservative, describing the use of the picaresque narrative form in Paul as "a recognition that there is value in remaining outside capitalist and heteronormative logics that would want to assimilate every dissident subject" and a reflection of the historical marginalization of queer people.

== See also ==
- Fierce Femmes and Notorious Liars
- Cereus Blooms at Night
- Oranges Are Not the Only Fruit
- Freshwater
- Tentacle
- Hybrid genre
