= Elizabeth Hinton =

American historian (born 1983)

Elizabeth Kai Hinton
- Born: June 26, 1983 (age 43); Ann Arbor, Michigan, U.S.
- Awards: Ralph Waldo Emerson Award, Phi Beta Kappa Society, Andrew Carnegie Fellowship, Carnegie Corporation

Academic background
- Education: New York University (B.A., 2005); Columbia University (M.A., 2007; M.Phil, 2008; Ph.D., 2013)
- Doctoral advisor: Eric Foner
- Other advisor: Heather Ann Thompson

Academic work
- Discipline: History
- Sub-discipline: African and African American Studies
- Institutions: Harvard University; Yale University
- Website: https://law.yale.edu/elizabeth-k-hinton

Elizabeth Kai Hinton (born June 26, 1983) is an American historian. She is Professor of History, African American Studies, and Law at Yale University and Yale Law School. Her research focuses on the persistence of poverty and racial inequality in the twentieth-century United States. Hinton was elected to the American Philosophical Society in 2022.

== Life ==
Hinton was born in Ann Arbor, Michigan to her parents, Ann Pearlman, a psychotherapist and writer, and Alfred Hinton, a retired art professor at the University of Michigan. She grew up in Ann Arbor but spent time in Saginaw, an hour north of the city. Her paternal grandfather was recruited by General Motors to leave the south for the north to work in a factory. As Saginaw declined, Hinton recalled the impact that drugs and unemployment had on her cousins who were often in and out of prison. That experience went on to influence her academic career.

She received her B.A. in Historical Sociology from New York University's Gallatin School in 2005. Hinton completed a Ph.D. in United States History at Columbia University in 2013. Hinton divorced her first husband in 2017. She is remarried and lives in New Haven with her current husband and their two children.

== Career ==
Before joining the Yale Faculty she was a John L. Loeb Associate Professor of the Social Sciences in the Departments of History and African and African American Studies at Harvard University, and a Postdoctoral Scholar in the University of Michigan Society of Fellows.

She has contributed articles and op-ed pieces to periodicals including The Journal of American History, the Journal of Urban History, The New York Times, and the Los Angeles Times.

Hinton's 2016 book From the War on Poverty to the War on Crime examines the history and modern-day issues in regard to the intertwined relationship between crime and poverty. She argues that this relationship goes farther back than one would think, such as anti-delinquency acts, the War on Poverty and "war on crime" in the Johnson administration, and the Juvenile Justice and Delinquency Prevention Act of 1974.

Her latest book, America on Fire, examines the social and political history of localized uprisings, riots, and protests around issues of police violence in minor and major cities across the United States.

Hinton served as PhD advisor for poet and scholar Jackie Wang.

== Works ==
- America on Fire: The Untold History of Police Violence and Black Rebellion Since the 1960s, New York: Liveright, 2021. ISBN 9781631498909
- From the war on poverty to the War on Crime: The Making of Mass Incarceration in America, Cambridge, Massachusetts: Harvard University Press, 2016. ISBN 9780674979826, OCLC 1007099147
- Co-edited with Manning Marable, The New Black History: Revisiting the Second Reconstruction, New York: Palgrave Macmillan, 2011. ISBN 9781403977779
