= Alien Daughters Walk Into the Sun =

2023 memoir by Jackie Wang

Alien Daughters Walk Into the Sun: An Almanac of Extreme Girlhood
- Author: Jackie Wang
- Publisher: Semiotext(e)
- Publication date: November 21, 2023
- Pages: 408
- ISBN: 978-1635901924

Alien Daughters Walk Into the Sun: An Almanac of Extreme Girlhood is a 2023 memoir by Jackie Wang, published by Semiotext(e).

== Contents ==
Having been known as an academic for works like Carceral Capitalism, Wang initially had reservations about the book's audience and how it would be received by "the academy." Ultimately, she felt "constitutionally incapable of doing something other than what I want to do, simply because I'm supposed to do it" and made the decision to put together and publish Alien Daughters Walk Into the Sun: An Almanac of Extreme Girlhood. The book collects Wang's diary entries, online posts, published essays and reviews, poems, conversations, lectures, and other written material in the span from 2006 to 2016.

The first page of the book contains a screenshot of an email from Bhanu Kapil to Wang in 2011: "I think you are going to make a huge book. An almanac for extreme girlhood." At the time, Wang wasn't yet decided on putting together a book of her writings. In graduate school, she turned in a manuscript of "old writings" to Jamaica Kincaid for an autobiography class. She later attempted to put another manuscript together in 2015, and her publisher, Semiotext(e), made plans with Wang to release an essay collection after Carceral Capitalism's release in 2018. Not satisfied with any of her recent plans for a book, Wang instead returned to Kapil's concept of an "almanac for extreme girlhood" with help from Chris Kraus at Semiotext(e).

== Critical reception ==
Critics observed the book's destabilization of the memoir genre. Luna Kim Yeh, for the Englewood Review of Books, lauded elements of Wang's technique, specifically her use of the second-person perspective, the epistolary form, and the diversity of "musings" compiled in her book. Similarly, Olivia Durif in Full Stop, appreciated Wang's rawness and called the book "radically different from most contemporary memoirs" and closer in kind to the creative nonfiction from "the dawn of the Maggie Nelson era—essays with lots of unanalyzed quotes from other essayists." The Rumpus said the book bore many identities—"collage, travelogue, timeline" but was "a conversation most of all." SPAM Zine wrote that "Wang’s elliptical style, which swerves between prose and poetry, allows for these blips in reading – be they pleasurable or spent. It is a discursive and curious style: jagged, fragile, errant, allusive, intrepid."

Other critics observed the diverse range of subject matter and experiences Wang encompassed. The Los Angeles Review of Books appreciated Wang's "wild teens-and-twenties tales and free-range groping toward gender theory". C Magazine said "Wang moves through the world with a porousness that facilitates both adventure and misfortune. This effusive style complements her tendency to wander, both literally and philosophically."

Frieze's editors named the book in a list of their top books of 2023.
