= Ling Ling Huang =

American author and violinist (born 1989)

Ling Ling Huang (born 1989) is an American violinist and author. Her debut novel, Natural Beauty (2023), won the 2024 Lambda Literary Award for Bisexual Literature.

== Early life and education ==
Ling Ling Huang was born in 1989. A first-generation Chinese American whose parents came to the United States from Beijing, she grew up near Houston, Texas.

Huang began playing violin at age 4. She started attending the Cleveland Institute of Music at age 15, then pursued further studies in music at Rice University.

== Career ==
=== Music ===
Trained as a classical violinist, Huang performs professionally with various orchestras. In 2021, she won a Grammy Award for Best Classical Solo Vocal Album as part of the Experiential Orchestra.

=== Writing ===
In 2023, Huang released her debut novel, Natural Beauty. The book is a work of satirical horror that draws on her own experience working retail in the wellness industry. Natural Beauty won the 2024 Lambda Literary Award for Bisexual Literature.

Her second novel, Immaculate Conception, was published in 2025. The gothic horror novel chronicles a codependent relationship between two female artists. Immaculate Conception won an Oregon Book Award in 2026.

== Personal life ==
Huang identifies as queer. Now based in Portland, Oregon, she and her husband have one child.
