= Natural Beauty (novel) =

2023 novel by Ling Ling Huang

- First edition cover
- Author: Ling Ling Huang
- Cover artist: Kaitlin Kall
- Language: English
- Genre: Gothic fiction; horror fiction; satire
- Set in: New York City
- Publisher: Dutton
- Publication date: April 4, 2023
- Publication place: U.S.
- Media type: Print (hardback), audio book, ebook
- Pages: 257 (first edition)
- ISBN: 978-059347292-7
- OCLC: 1335755735
- LC Class: PS3608.U22483
- Website: https://www.penguinrandomhouse.com/books/718580/natural-beauty-by-ling-ling-huang

Natural Beauty is a 2023 satirical horror novel by Ling Ling Huang that explores the intersection of beauty and wellness standards with social issues like classism, racism, and sexism. Her debut novel, it was published on April 4, 2023, by Dutton. It is in development for a television adaptation by eOne, to be co-produced by Constance Wu and Drew Comins.

== Plot ==
The unnamed protagonist is a young second-generation Chinese American woman whose narrative shifts between her childhood as a piano prodigy and her present time beginning work for a beauty and wellness company.

Her parents are also talented pianists who immigrated to the United States from China immediately following the Cultural Revolution. After they are severely injured in a car crash, they must reside in a long-term care facility, and the protagonist's struggle to pay for this care drives her to leave music and seek paid work.

Her new job demands that she undertake escalating measures to conform to the aesthetic standards of the company, and she must eventually confront what horrors these standards entail, both personally and globally.

== Major themes ==
A New York Times review described the novel as "a meditation on vanity, the ways in which the pursuit of physical beauty can betray the other sources of beauty in one's life," while Publishers Weekly noted themes of "insidious Western standards, fears about bodily autonomy, and queer desire."

In an interview with Vogue, Constance Wu said that "the themes of the beauty industry and beauty standards that we place upon women that are rooted in sexism, racism, classism" were part of what motivated her to option it for a television adaptation.

== Development history ==
Huang has traced the origin of the novel to her own experiences working in the beauty industry: "Figuring out why I have visible pores and things that are totally normal started becoming exhausting, and that's when I realized I should take a closer look at why I've just accepted all of this as work I need to do."

== Reception ==
A Wired review lauded the novel as "a delightfully baroque grotesque", while a New York Times review said that its transition into horror felt jarring, but that Huang is "at her best when she skewers the narcissistic, corrosive version of self-care that can be mistaken for empowerment." Kirkus Reviews said the novel "ultimately moves too quickly to provide a satisfactory payoff on the many mysteries it lays out."

The novel was among the New York Times Editors' Choice recommendations for new novels in April 2023. It received starred reviews, marking it as exceptional, by Booklist and Publishers Weekly.

Natural Beauty won the 2024 Lambda Literary Award for Bisexual Fiction.

== Television adaptation ==
Natural Beauty is in development for a television adaptation by eOne. It is to be co-produced by Constance Wu and Drew Comins, an executive producer for the television series Yellowjackets.
