= Sulaiman Addonia =

Eritrea-born British author

Sulaiman S.M.Y. Addonia (Tigrinya: ሱላእማን ኣድዶንኣ; born 1974) is a British author who also works at a creative writing academy for refugees. He lived in refugee camps from the age of two years old until he received asylum in England in 1990.

== Biography ==
Addonia was born in 1974 in Omhajer to a mother from the Province of Eritrea and an Ethiopian father.

In 1976, after his father's murder, Addonia, along with his family, relocated to a refugee camp in Sudan. Two years later, his mother left for Jeddah, Saudi Arabia where she was a domestic worker, during which time, he and his brother were raised by their grandparents. In 1984, Addonia and his brother followed to Jeddah, and he was able to study. During this time, Addonia and his brother developed a love of literature. Throughout his time in Sudan and Saudi Arabia, Addonia witnessed much violence, especially against women, including his mother, which led to insomnia. His insomnia allowed him to study while others slept, and he received a school certificate while in Saudi Arabia.

In 1990, Addonia and his brother obtained asylum in England and though he didn't speak any English upon arrival, he eventually studied development at SOAS University of London, then economics at University College London. Although he now has a stable life, Addonia has noted that "you never really stop being a refugee."

Addonia became a naturalized British citizen in 2000.

He has a Belgian wife and in 2009, they moved to Brussels, though they now live in London. In 2009, the pair had a son.

He also uses his mother's surname, Sadiyah-Mebrat.

== Selected texts ==
=== The Consequences of Love (2008) ===
Addonia's first novel, entitled The Consequences of Love (published by Chatto & Windus, 2008), is a love story set in Jeddah, Saudi Arabia. Naser, a 20 year old refugee from Eritrea, falls in love when a woman wearing a burqa drops a note at his feet. She identifies herself by a pair of pink shoes, and the two embark on an epistolary romance, hoping to meet face to face. They live in fear that the religious police may learn of their illegal romance.

Addonia has noted that while some of the details from the story align with his life path, the story is in no way autobiographical.

The book "was nominated for the Commonwealth Writer’s prize and translated into more than 20 languages."

=== Silence Is My Mother Tongue (2018) ===
His second novel, Silence Is My Mother Tongue (published by The Indigo Press, 2018), follows " two siblings attempting to find stability within the chaos of a [refugee] camp."

The concept of "silence" being a "mother tongue" comes from Addonia's experience as a child refugee. Addonia has discussed his relationship to language in his essay, "The Wound of Multilingualism: On Surrendering the Languages of Home," wherein he notes that he has been forced to forgo "the language of home" on numerous occasions. Though his native language is Tigryina, Addonia attempted to learn Amharic while in an Ethiopian refugee camp, but the language reminded him of his murdered father, and therefore, it "was a language of grief, of violence, of loss, of unattained longing." He stepped out of it quickly" and "returned to silence." When he was enrolled in a Sudanese school, his connection to his native languages dwindled, and by the time he moved to Saudi Arabia, he was fluent in Arabic. Upon arrival in England, Addonia began learning English, further disconnecting him from his history. Of the experience, Addonia has said

It was like taking a hammer to the home I had built in the Arabic language word by word, over many years in Sudan and Saudi Arabia. My increasing strength in English correlated negatively with my Arabic. The more I felt at home in English, the less Arabic felt like one. So much so that learning a new language was to acquire a new wound. Multilingualism meant multi-wounding.

Although learning English allowed him to connect with others in his new location, it also meant he could no longer understand his family, another reminder of their separation.

The book was a finalist for the Lambda Literary Award for Bisexual Fiction and was long-listed for the 2019 Orwell Prize for Political Fiction.

== Awards and honors ==
Addonia was elected a Fellow of the Royal Society of Literature in 2022.

Year	Award	Result	Ref.
2021	Lambda Literary Award for Bisexual Fiction	Finalist	
2019	Orwell Prize for Political Fiction	Longlist	

== Reviews ==
- - Times Online
- - The Independent
- - Marie Claire
- - Evening Standard

== Bibliography ==
=== Books ===
- The Consequences of Love (2008)
- Silence is My Mother Tongue (2018)
- The Seers (2024)

=== Anthology contributions ===
- Down the Angel and Up Holloway (2006)
- Addis Ababa Noir (2021)
