= Shanequa Gay =

Shanequa Gay (born 1977) is a visual artist and activist from Atlanta, Georgia. Her work has been exhibited in countries such as the United States, Canada, Japan, Italy, and South Africa. Gay's artwork is included in major collections, such as Michelle Obama's and Samuel L. Jackson's.

Her art has a focus on social justice.

== Early life and education ==
Gay was born in 1977.

In 1999, she graduated from the Art Institute of Atlanta with an Associate of Arts in Graphic Design and Fashion Marketing. She graduated with a Bachelor of Arts in painting at SCAD in 2015, then later graduated with a Master of Fine Arts from Georgia State.

== Career ==
Gay’s installation piece Marginalized and Mythological has been displayed at Augusta University.

Gay started her residency at Baldwin's Room, located in Johannesburg, South Africa in 2015.

In 2019, Shanequa Gay's work the unnameable, unspeakable divine ascension was exhibited at the Zuckerman Museum of Art in an exhibition titled Fruitful Labors. Her piece surrounded two photographs also created by her, titled metanoia and delos.

In 2019, Shanequa Gay was part of a committee of eleven artists for the Off The Wall initiative, a mural project made to highlight Atlanta's involvement in the Civil Rights movement and social justice history while connecting with current day social issues, which was led by the Atlanta Super Bowl Host Committee. The murals were featured in multiple locations across Atlanta. Gay's mural, titled Excuse me while I kiss the sky, is shown on the walls of the Vine City station at Atlanta’s MARTA. The mural was inspired by a conversation she heard at Convenant House, with the mural being about homeless people in Atlanta who sleep under vegetation.

On August 1, 2019, Gay’s artwork La Pieta (2015) was acquired by Oglethorpe University's Museum of Art and was a gift of the Student Government Association after a student-led initiative that advocated to increase diversity in the university’s art museum. La Pieta uses oil paint on a 48 by 48 inch wood panel. This was the start of Gay’s relationship with the museum, along with the first painting of hers be to acquired by the university.

During 2020, the Hudgens Center for Art & Learning displayed one of Gay's murals titled Sweet Sacrament Divine, which showcased a mythical creature she created called "devouts", which have human bodies and animal heads. The piece also depicts Jim Jones. The piece reflects Gay's experiences of growing up in Dallas and Atlanta, with it intending to commentate on the treatment of women in southern Christianity, as Gay describes her own piece as “a kind of satire on the cult-like following of Christian religion in the South...” The mural exclusively uses shades of green and coral pink.

In 2021 Gay’s work was shown at the exhibition Le Monde Bossale in Montreal, Canada.

In 2022, Shanequa Gay's artwork Hey Slim was acquired and put on display permanently at the Oglethorpe Museum of Art, located on the campus of Oglethorpe University. The piece was on display at the exhibition Beloved Community: African American Artists in Atlanta Collections and Beyond in spring of 2022. In September of 2022, she started her residency at Oglethrope University for the 2022-2023 school year while also working as a visiting professor at Spelman College.

Gay’s artwork Ancestral Chorus (2025) was featured at the exhibition Y3K: Black Quantum Futures.

== List of Works ==
List of artwork done by Gay

- La Pieta, 2015, oil on wood panel, 48 by 48 inches, Oglethorpe University, Brookhaven, Georgia.
- Sweet Sacrament Divine, 2020, mural.
- The Great Ascension, 2021, sculptural figures.
- Ode to Kathryn Johnston, 2021, performance still on digital billboard, 20 by 70 feet.
- Trinity (study), 2021, mixed media on paper, 25 by 41½ inches.
- hey slim, 2022, mixed media on wood panel, 36 by 72 inches.
- Memory as Madonna, 2023, mixed media on wood panel, 48 by 48 inches.
- mama stella's half, 2024, photographic transfer on chiffon, 72 by 54 inches.
- mama stella's quarter, 2024, photographic transfer on chiffon, 72 by 54 inches.
- sky woman, 2024, cyanotype transfer on chiffon, 36 by 54 inches.
- sit for a spell, 2024, cyanotype transfer on chiffon, 36 by 54 inches.
- Standing on Business, 2024, mixed media on wood panel, 60 by 40 inches.
- Ancestral Chorus, 2025, mixed media.
- on the cosmic track, 2025, mixed media on archival somerset velvet paper, 24 by 30 inches.
- lap baby, 2025, ink on vellum, 9 1/16 by 6 inches.
- step and repeat, copy and paste times infinity², 2025, ink on vellum, 9 1/16 by 6 inches.

== List of Exhibitions ==
2019

- 2019 - Fruitful Labors at Kennesaw State University’s Zuckerman Museum of Art.
- 2019 - Lit Without Sherman at Hammonds House Museum in Atlanta, solo exhibition.

2020s

- 2020 - Holding Space for Nobility: A Memorial for Breonna Taylor
- 2020 - Adorned at McColl Center for Arts and Innovation in Charlotte, North Carolina.
- 2021 - Le Monde Bossale in Montreal, Canada.
- 2022 - Beloved Community: African American Artists in Atlanta Collections and Beyond, hosted at Oglethorpe University.
- 2023 - Thought and Memory, solo exhibition.
- 2025 - Ancestral Mirror, solo exhibition, at Clark Atlanta University Art Museum.
- 2025 - Y3K: Black Quantum Futures
- 2026 - New South, Ground Truth at The Museum of Contemporary Art Arlington.
- 2026 - Repossessions at Harvey B. Gantt Center for African-American Arts + Culture, at the Levine Center for the Arts.

== In Media ==
Gay's work has been featured in both movies and television shows.

Movies

- Addicted

TV Shows

- Zoe Ever After
- Being Mary Jane
- Greenleaf
