= Bushra Rehman =

Muslim-American writer

- Born: New York City, US
- Language: English
- Genre: contemporary
- Years active: 2018–present

Website
- bushrarehman.com

Bushra Rehman is a Pakistani-American novelist best known for her Lambda Literary Award-nominated novel Roses, in the Mouth of a Lion and short story Corona.

== Early life ==
A follower of Islam, Rehman grew up in Corona, Queens close to one of the first Sunni masjids in NYC. She says the first book that made an impact on her is A Tree Grows in Brooklyn.

She originally began her writing career as a poet and has worked as a poetry teacher.

Rehman is queer.

== Selected works ==
In 2002, Rehma co-created the anthology Colonize This! Young Women of Color on Today's Feminism with Daisy Hernández, as a response to the hate crimes against people of color she and her co-creator witnessed in NYC post 9/11.

Rehman's novel Roses in the Mouth, is loosely based on her own experience growing up in Corona, Queens in the 1980s and learning more about her own queer identity. Inspired by the strength of the friendships with other girls she had growing up, she set out writing Roses in the Mouth to celebrate those friendships. Rehman says grief is an important theme in the novel. The New Yorker named it one of the best books of 2022. It was nominated for a Lambda Literary Award in the category Bisexual Fiction.

== Bibliography ==
Anthologies:

- Colonize This! Young Women of Color on Today's Feminism (Seal Press, 2002)
- Roses, in the Mouth of a Lion (Flatiron, 2022)
- Marianna's Beauty Salon (Sibling Rivalry Press, 2018)
- Corona (Sibling Rivalry Press, 2013)
