= The Rupture =

American literary magazine

- Editor: Gabriel Blackwell
- Former editors: Matt Bell
- Frequency: Bimonthly
- Founder: Matt Bell
- Founded: 2009
- First issue: August 2009
- Country: United States
- Based in: Michigan
- Language: English
- Website: www.therupturemag.com

The Rupture (formerly named The Collagist) is a literary journal founded in 2009 by American author Matt Bell. The first issue appeared in August 2009. It was renamed The Rupture in 2019. It is one of the longest running online literary magazines. Work appearing in The Rupture has appeared in numerous award anthologies, including the Pushcart Prize, The Best American Poetry, the Wigleaf top 50, the Best of the Net.

== See also ==
- List of literary magazines
