= You Exist Too Much =

2020 novel by Zaina Arafat

- Author: Zaina Arafat
- Language: English
- Genre: Literary fiction
- Publisher: Catapult
- Publication date: June 9, 2020
- Publication place: United States
- Media type: Print (hardcover, paperback), Audio
- ISBN: 9781948226509

You Exist Too Much is the debut novel of Palestinian-American writer Zaina Arafat, published June 9, 2020 by Catapult. The book won the Lambda Literary Award for Bisexual Fiction in 2021.

== Synopsis ==
The novel follows an unnamed Palestinian-American woman struggling with destructive relationship patterns and her bisexual identity. After a series of obsessive, failed relationships, she seeks help at an unconventional treatment center, where she is diagnosed with "love addiction." Told through interconnected vignettes moving between past and present, the novel chronicles her journey toward understanding how her Palestinian heritage, her father's abandonment, and her mother's rejection of her sexuality have shaped her desperate search for love and belonging, moving between Jordan, Italy, Palestine, and the United States.

== Summary ==
The novel follows an unnamed Palestinian American woman as she struggles to unlearn cycles of longing, secrecy, and emotional self-erasure. As a child in Bethlehem, she's shamed for wearing shorts near the Church of the Nativity. Her mother's cold response marks the beginning of a lifelong pattern: craving affection from women who cannot or will not return it.

In early adulthood, she moves to Florence after college, hoping to reinvent herself through language, distance, and art. Instead, she falls into a tight-knit expat circle that nicknames her closest companions the Sacrifice—a Dutch girl with whom she develops a deep, co-dependent bond—and the Savior, a Salvadoran girl with whom she briefly shares a flirtation. Her relationship with the Sacrifice is emotionally charged and blurs the lines between friendship and desire. They sleep in the same bed, share private rituals, and act like a couple without ever defining the connection—until the Sacrifice confesses love and abruptly leaves. The narrator's fragile sense of self collapses, and she returns to the U.S. months early, disoriented and depressed.

Back in New York, she moves in with Anna, a girlfriend she later betrays by carrying on a secret emotional affair with a married professor. When Anna discovers the emails, she leaves. Shaken, the narrator admits herself to a treatment centre for love and sex addiction in Kentucky, where she begins to face the compulsions that have shaped her life. In therapy, she confesses a crush on her female therapist and, for the first time, receives understanding instead of rejection.

Later, while pursuing an MFA in the Midwest, she begins an affair with Matías, a married writer. When he invites her to Buenos Aires, she declines, recognising the fantasy for what it is. Her pattern of destructive longing persists through hookups, DJing, and a toxic entanglement with her neighbour Tara, but her friendship with Renata, with whom she has a brief romantic moment that Renate rejects, is steady, non-sexual, and long-lasting, serves as an emotional anchor.

The novel ends with a trip to the Middle East for her grandmother's funeral. She passes the Israeli border on her way to the West Bank, she asks not to have her passport stamped so she can still visit Lebanon—a quiet expression of her split identity. In Bethlehem and Amman, she confronts her estranged mother and begins to see the mirroring between their traumas. Upon returning to the U.S., she finds herself in a new relationship with Anouk, a woman who is emotionally present and undramatic—unlike every partner before her. In the final scene, as the narrator kisses Anouk and reflects on “making room” for her, the moment suggests a slow, hard-earned shift: she may finally be choosing love rooted in reality, not in absence.

== Reception ==
You Exist Too Much received positive reviews from the Los Angeles Review of Books, The San Francisco Book Review, Washington Independent Review of Books, NPR, The Irish Times, and Publishers Weekly.

NPR's Gabino Iglesias wrote that You Exist Too Much is "a perfect example of how culture and family can affect those whose lives span different realities."

Sarah Mills, writing for the Los Angeles Review of Books, called it "[a]n unpretentious read," saying, "[W]hat the novel lacks in richness and layers, it makes up for in accessibility and honesty, steering clear of the stereotypes that so often plague characters from a Middle Eastern background."

The Washington Independent Review's Antoaneta Tileva said it is "an engrossing character study of a young, bisexual Palestinian American woman. Much more than an exploration of intersecting lines and identities, the debut novel revels in their clouding."

Kirkus, The Washington Post, New York Times Book Review, and Booklist provided mixed reviews. Kirkus called the book "uneven," a sentiment echoed in Publishers Weekly's review, though they agreed the novel was "intriguing."

Booklist's Terry Hong said, "Debuting novelist Arafat’s damaged cast might resonate with untethered millennials, but utmost patience is a must."

In 2021, You Exist Too Much won the Lambda Literary Award for Bisexual Fiction.
