= Dorothy Chan =

American poet and academic

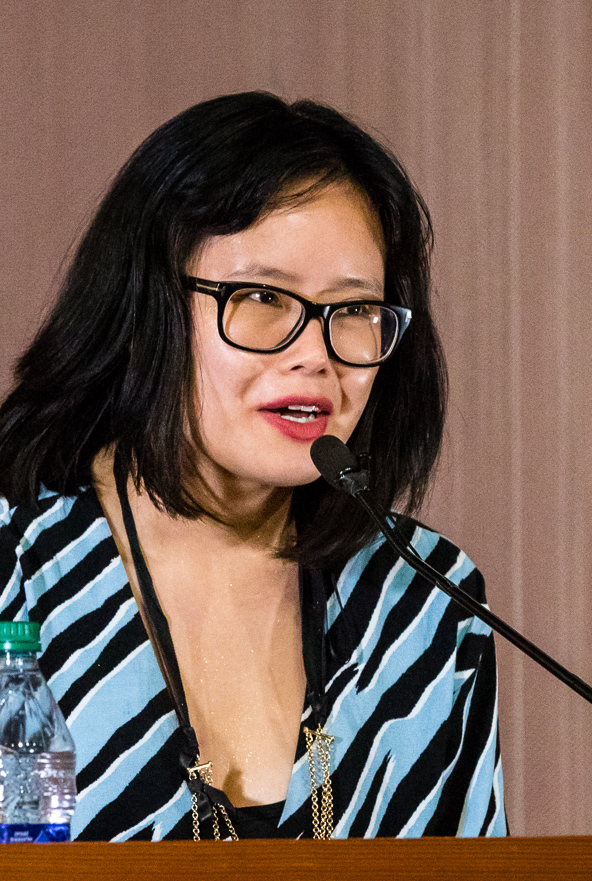
- Chan at Arizona State University in 2018
- Education: Cornell University; Arizona State University; Florida State University
- Occupations: Poet; editor; academic
- Writing career
- Genre: Poetry

Dorothy Chan is a queer Chinese American poet, editor, and academic. Chan is the author of one chapbook and four full-length poetry collections, and teaches at the University of Wisconsin–Eau Claire.

== Education and career ==
Chan earned degrees from Cornell University, Arizona State University, and Florida State University. Their chapbook, Chinatown Sonnets, won New Delta Review's sixth annual chapbook contest, judged by Douglas Kearney.

Chan's full-length poetry collections are Attack of the Fifty-Foot Centerfold (2018), Revenge of the Asian Woman (2019), BABE (2021), and Return of the Chinese Femme (2024). Revenge of the Asian Woman was a finalist for the Lambda Literary Award in Bisexual Poetry and the Theodore Roethke Memorial Poetry Prize. Return of the Chinese Femme was also a finalist for the Lambda Literary Award in Bisexual Poetry.

Chan is an associate professor at the University of Wisconsin–Eau Claire and co-founder and editor-in-chief of Honey Literary.

== Works ==
- Chinatown Sonnets (chapbook). New Delta Review. 2017.
- Attack of the Fifty-Foot Centerfold. Spork Press. 2018.
- Revenge of the Asian Woman. Diode Editions. 2019. ISBN 978-1-939728-26-5.
- BABE. Diode Editions. 2021.
- Return of the Chinese Femme. Deep Vellum. 2024. ISBN 978-1-64605-310-0.
