= List of gay male teen novels =

This is a list of gay male teen fiction books.

== Books ==
Title	Author	Country	Published	Film	Awards	References
A Question of Manhood	Robin Reardon	United States	2010			
A Secret Edge	Robin Reardon	United States	2007			
Absolutely, Positively Not	David LaRochelle		2005			
Angry Management	Chris Crutcher	United States	2009			
Another Kind of Cowboy	Susan Juby	Canada	2007			
Aristotle and Dante Discover the Secrets of the Universe	Benjamin Alire Sáenz	United States	2012	Aristotle and Dante Discover the Secrets of the Universe		
Aristotle and Dante Dive into the Waters of the World	Benjamin Alire Sáenz	United States	2021			
As You Wish	Jackson Pearce	United States	2010			
At Swim, Two Boys	Jamie O'Neill	Ireland (Republic of Ireland)	2001			
Athletic Shorts: Six Short Stories	Chris Crutcher	United States	1991			
Baby Be-Bop	Francesca Lia Block	United States	1995			
Boy Meets Boy	David Levithan	United States	2003			
Boyfriends with Girlfriends	Alex Sánchez	United States	2011			
Call Me by Your Name	André Aciman	United States	2007	Call Me by Your Name (2017)	Lambda Literary Award for Gay Fiction winner	
Dance on My Grave	Aidan Chambers	United Kingdom	1982			
Drama Queers!	Frank Anthony Polito		2009		Lambda Literary Award for Gay Romance winner	
Dramarama	E. Lockhart	United States	2007			
Dream Boy	Jim Grimsley	United States	1995	Dream Boy (2008)		
Eight Seconds	Jean Ferris	United States	2000			
Geography Club	Brent Hartinger	United States	2003	Geography Club (2013)		
Getting It	Alex Sánchez	United States	2006			
Hello, I Lied	Marijane Meaker	United States	1997			
Hero	Perry Moore	United States	2007			
I'll Get There. It Better Be Worth the Trip	John Donovan	United States	1969			
Impulse	Ellen Hopkins	United States	2007			
Ironside: A Modern Faery's Tale	Holly Black	United States	2007			
Kampala – Hamburg: Roman einer Flucht	Lutz van Dijk	Germany	2020			
Kiss	Jacqueline Wilson	United Kingdom	2007			
My Most Excellent Year	Steve Kluger	United States	2008			
Openly Straight	Bill Konigsberg	United States	2013			
Out of the Pocket	Bill Konigsberg	United States	2008		Lambda Literary Award for Children's and Young Adult Literature winner	
Pioneer Summer	Katerina Silvanova; Elena Malisova	Russia	2021			
A Place for Wolves	Kosoko Jackson	United States	N/A			
Popular	Gareth Russell	United Kingdom	2011			
Proxy	Alex London	United States	2013			
Red, White & Royal Blue	Casey McQuiston	United States	2019	Red, White & Royal Blue (2023)	Goodreads 2019 Best Romance and Best Debut Novel	
Simon vs. the Homo Sapiens Agenda	Becky Albertalli	United States	2015	Love, Simon (2018)		
So Hard to Say	Alex Sánchez	United States	2004		Lambda Literary Award for Children's and Young Adult Literature winner	
Someday This Pain Will Be Useful to You	Peter Cameron	United States	2007	Someday This Pain Will Be Useful to You (2011)	Ferro-Grumley Award winner	
Something Like Summer	Jay Bell	United States	2011	Something Like Summer (2017)		
Son of a Witch	Gregory Maguire	United States	2005			
Sprout	Dale Peck	United States	2009			
Suicide Notes	Michael Thomas Ford	United States	2008			
Swimming in the Monsoon Sea	Shyam Selvadurai	Canada	2005		Lambda Literary Award winner	
The Athenaeum	Raul Pompeia	Brazil	1888			
The Boys on the Rock	John Fox	United States	1984			
The City Beautiful	Aden Polydoros	United States	2021		Sydney Taylor Book Award winner	
The Evolution of Ethan Poe	Robin Reardon	United States	2011			
The God Box	Alex Sánchez	United States	2007			
The Immaculate Deception	Gareth Russell	United Kingdom	2012			
The Man Without a Face	Isabelle Holland	United States	1972	The Man Without a Face (1993)		
The Perks of Being a Wallflower	Stephen Chbosky	United States	1999	The Perks of Being a Wallflower (2012)		
The Revelations of Jude Connor	Robin Reardon	United States	2013			
The Sledding Hill	Chris Crutcher	United States	2005			
The Vast Fields of Ordinary	Nick Burd	United States	2009		Stonewall Book Award winner Lambda Literary Award finalist	
They Both Die at the End	Adam Silvera	United States	2017			
Thinking Straight	Robin Reardon	United States	2008			
This High School Has Closets	Robert Joseph Greene	Canada	2012			
Totally Joe	James Howe	United States	2005			
Two Boys Kissing	David Levithan	United States	2013			
Vintage: A Ghost Story	Steve Berman	United States	2007		Andre Norton Award finalist	
War Boy	Thorn Kief Hillsbery	United States	2000			
What They Always Tell Us	Martin Wilson	United States	2008			
Will Grayson, Will Grayson	John Green and David Levithan	United States	2010			
Would You Mind?	Robert Joseph Greene	Canada	2013			
You Know Me Well	David Levithan and Nina LaCour	United States	2016			

== Series ==
Series Name	Author
Something Like... series	Jay Bell
The Mortal Instruments	Cassandra Clare
The Cadelonian Series	Ginn Hale
The Russel Middlebrook Series	Brent Hartinger
Russell Middlebrook: The Futon Years	Brent Hartinger
The Otto Digmore Series	Brent Hartinger
The Simon Snow series	Rainbow Rowell
All for the Game	Nora Sakavic
Rainbow trilogy	Alex Sánchez
The Infinity Cycle	Adam Silvera
The Raven Cycle	Maggie Stiefvater

== See also ==
- LGBT literature
- Young adult fiction
