= The Elephant of Surprise =

Book by Brent Hartinger

- First edition
- Author: Brent Hartinger
- Language: English
- Genre: Gay teen fiction
- Publisher: Buddha Kitty Books
- Publication date: 2013
- Publication place: United States
- Pages: 224
- ISBN: 978-1505376739
- OCLC: 55065943
- Preceded by: Geography Club, The Order of the Poison Oak, Double Feature: Attack of the Soul Sucking Brain Zombies/Bride of the Soul Sucking Brain Zombies
- Followed by: The Thing I Didn't Know I Didn't Know

The Elephant of Surprise is a young adult novel by Brent Hartinger, the fourth volume in The Russel Middlebrook Series, which was published in March 2013. The book continues the saga of Russel Middlebrook, his friends Min and Gunnar, and his former boyfriend, Kevin Land. The book also introduces new characters, who are followers of the movement known as Freeganism. The title of the book is a malapropism for the common expression "the element of surprise." Russel, Gunnar and Min use it to refer to the unexpected in life. Such surprises can be devastating, but they also make things more exciting.

Russel explores Freeganism, his hometown (which looks very different when looking for food), and the possibility of forming a relationship with the handsome Wade, a Freegan. At the same time, he cannot forget his former love, Kevin, and asks Gunnar to keep tabs on him.

The sequel to The Elephant of Surprise and the fifth Russel Middlebrook book is The Thing I Didn't Know I Didn't Know.
