= Geography Club (play) =

Play written by Brent Hartinger

- Written by: Brent Hartinger
- Characters: Russel Middlebrook; Kevin Land; Min Lao; Gunnar; Trish Baskin; Kimberly; Belinda Sherman; Brian Bund; Ike; Therese; Jarred; Nate
- Setting: Gunnar's room Min's room Robert L. Goodkind High School

Premiere
- Date: Seattle FringeACT Festival 2004
- Place: Seattle, WA, USA

Geography Club is a play by American playwright and author Brent Hartinger, based on his novel Geography Club.

== Production history ==
Geography Club premiered as a staged reading in Seattle, Washington at the third annual Seattle FringeACT Festival of New Plays in 2004, directed by Ilene Fins. The Geography Club starred Brendan Callahan as Russel Middlebrook.

The play's production premiere was as the opening show at the first annual Northwest Playwright's Alliance Festival of New Plays in 2008. It was directed by David Domkoski (who applauded the play for being both "good and relevant to what's happening to kids right now") and starred Galen Wicks, then a senior at Tacoma School of the Arts, as Russel. One review said that "Geography Club stands confidently on a cliff-edge of new theater: theater for young people, dealing with hot topics seldom dramatized. Weaving through the ultra-delicate intricacies of teenage identity, the play builds strong themes of friendship and belonging, just as well (or better) as its original form."

Subsequent productions have taken place in Edmonton, Canada; Salt Lake City, Utah; and elsewhere.
