= Dream Boy (film) =

- Theatrical release poster
- Directed by: James Bolton
- Screenplay by: James Bolton
- Based on: Dream Boy by Jim Grimsley
- Produced by: James Bolton; Herb Hamsher
- Starring: Stephan Bender; Max Roeg
- Cinematography: Sarah Levy
- Edited by: Annette Davey; Chris Houghton
- Music by: Richard Buckner
- Production companies: Mettray Reformatory Pictures; Here! Films
- Distributed by: Regent Releasing
- Release date: October 24, 2008 (CIFF)
- Running time: 90 minutes
- Country: United States
- Language: English
- Budget: $1.2 million
- Box office: $6 million

Dream Boy is a 2008 American southern gothic romantic melodrama film written and directed by James Bolton, and based on Jim Grimsley's 1995 novel of the same name. It follows two gay teenagers falling in love in the rural South in the late 1970s.

== Plot ==
Nathan Davies (Stephan Bender), a shy and quiet but intelligent 15-year-old boy, moves to St. Francisville, Louisiana, with his parents Harlan (Thomas Jay Ryan) and Vivian (Diana Scarwid), one of many unexplained moves his family has made. Shortly after moving, he befriends his classmate and nextdoor neighbor Roy (Max Roeg), who is one year older than him and dating a girl named Evelyn (Rooney Mara); Roy also drives the city's school bus. Roy soon introduces Nathan to his homophobic friends Burke (Randy Wayne) and Randy (Owen Beckman), the former of whom is volatile and violent towards Nathan on a few occasions prior to the film's climax, including in one incident where Burke threatens to throw Nathan into a lake despite knowing Nathan cannot swim.

Roy's and Nathan's friendship develops as they visit each other's houses to help each other with homework, but it eventually evolves into a romantic relationship, albeit one that the boys keep hidden from their families and friends. As their relationship develops and the two engage in several sexual encounters, Roy begins to express violent jealousy towards Nathan and questions how Nathan can know so much about gay sex despite claiming to have no prior experience. Later in the film, it is gradually revealed that Nathan's father has inappropriately touched him in the past, which creates tension within Nathan's household, as his mother knows about the prior molestations. Roy, unaware of Nathan's past, has a fight with Nathan over Roy's jealousy, causing the two to temporarily separate.

One night, while drunk, Harlan attempts to sneak into Nathan's bedroom despite protestations from Nathan's mother. Nathan has set up a trap in the room to prevent his father from reaching him, and when his father trips over the trap Nathan set, Nathan flees from the house and hides in the woods and in a school bus for several days until Roy discovers him. Roy allows Nathan to sleep in his family's barn, and their relationship rekindles. Roy then invites Nathan to go camping with him, Burke, and Randy, and Nathan agrees. During the camping trip, Burke and Randy question why Roy and Nathan insist on sleeping in the same tent; later, the four travel to an abandoned plantation house that is purported to be haunted and inhabited by its prior owners' ghosts. While exploring the house, Burke and Randy split off from Roy and Nathan, who begin to have sex before being discovered by Burke and Randy. Roy runs away from the house while Nathan is struck in the head and carried up a set of stairs by someone later revealed to be Burke. Burke rapes Nathan and then seemingly kills him by striking him in the head with a blunt object. Roy and Randy discover Nathan's body the next day and summon the police and Nathan's parents, who believe him to be dead as well.

Before his own funeral, Nathan seemingly awakens although his clothes are covered in blood. He witnesses his own funeral, after which Vivian leaves Harlan. Later, Nathan enters the barn Roy allowed him to hide in and sees Roy weeping. The two embrace, and the film ends with Roy driving the schoolbus while smiling at Nathan through the rear-view window.

=== Differences from novel ===
The movie departs from the novel and leaves the impression that Nathan is truly dead, and that the previous scenes were a wishful dream sequence of one of the two boy lovers, presumably Roy. In the book this scene does not take place. The book has the boys meeting in the yard of Roy's church, running together into the woods to talk things over, and deciding to run away together since Roy has been seen kissing Nathan by both Burke and Randy, and both boys will surely be outed to their families and the whole community. The book ends with: "They hear the voices of people searching for them in the woods. They stand and go. They never look back."

== Cast ==
- Stephan Bender as Nathan Davies
- Maximillian Roeg as Roy
- Randy Wayne as Burke, one of Roy's best friends
- Owen Beckman as Randy, one of Roy's best friends
- Thomas Jay Ryan as Harland Davies, Nathan's abusive father
- Diana Scarwid as Vivian Davies, Nathan's mother
- Rooney Mara as Evelyn, Roy's girlfriend
- Rickie Lee Jones as Roy's mother

== Release ==
Dream Boy first screened at the Berlin International Film Festival in Germany on February 15, 2008. Its first American screening was on October 24, 2008, at the Chicago International Film Festival. The film was released on DVD in North America on August 24, 2010.

== Reception ==
Jay Weissberg from Variety criticized the film's "countless cliches" and generic approach to its subject matter. He considered the score to be distracting and also criticized the film's editing, particularly in the scenes taking place during the film's climax in the plantation house. Weissberg also negatively received most of the cast's acting, although he mostly credited the film's "uninspired dialogue" for the poor acting performances. However, he praised Scarwig's performance.
