= The God Box =

The God Box may refer to:

- The God Box (novel), a 2007 novel by Alex Sanchez
- The God Box (album), a 2017 album by David Banner
- Interchurch Center, a building in New York City nicknamed the "God Box"
- The God Box, a 1989 novel by Barry B. Longyear
