= LGBTQ teen fiction =

LGBT teen fiction may refer to:

- Gay male teen fiction
- Lesbian literature § Young adult fiction
- Bisexual literature § Young adult fiction
