= Homosexual teen fiction =

Homosexual teen fiction may refer to:

- Gay teen fiction
- Lesbian teen fiction
