= Gay teen fiction =

Subgenre of LGBTQ+ literature

Gay teen fiction is a subgenre that overlaps with LGBTQ+ literature and young adult literature. This article covers books about gay and bisexual teenage characters who are male.

The genre of young adult literature is usually considered to begin with Maureen Daly's Seventeenth Summer, which was published in 1942. Seventeenth Summer is often credited with starting young adult literature because it was one of the first adolescent problem novels. Critics trace the origin of the "new realism" or "problem novel" in teen fiction to the period from 1967 through 1969, during which S. E. Hinton's The Outsiders, Paul Zindel's The Pigman, and other pivotal titles were published. These young adult novels were characterized by candor, unidealized characters and settings, colloquial and realistic language, and plots that portrayed realistic problems faced by contemporary young adults that did not necessarily find resolution in a happy ending. Because gay young adult novels often center on problems that gay teen characters encounter because of their sexuality, these books are often classified as examples of the "problem novel" genre.

== History ==
In 1969, the publication of I'll Get There. It Better Be Worth the Trip by John Donovan announced the arrival of gay and lesbian literature as a new genre within young adult fiction. During and after the 2000s, and especially since the legalization of gay marriage in 2015, gay teen fiction has become a blossoming genre found in most major bookstores.

In the years from 1969 through 1992, approximately sixty young adult novels with gay/lesbian characters or themes appeared in the United States. The rate of production of this body of literature has roughly doubled over the years, with approximately half (thirty-one) of the books published in the sixteen years from 1969 through 1984, and the rest (twenty-nine) published in the following eight years, from 1985 through 1992. From 1998 to 2003, 42 more novels were published with LGBTQ characters.

=== Publication ===
Despite the apparent wider acceptance of these novels, publishing them can be difficult. Geography Club, about a high school gay support group, was rejected seventeen times before it was published. Author Brent Hartinger said, "Editors told my agent again and again that there was no market for a book like this, and all my agent's agent-friends told her she was wasting her time on a gay teen book." Publishers often seem motivated by the desire to maximize their profits, and librarians are often restricted by limited acquisitions budgets. Neither of these factors work to support, much less create, an environment in which much literature will be produced that explores homosexuality for adolescents in any meaningful way.

Although larger publishing houses may reject homosexual fiction because of the smaller market, there are publishing houses available that focus on this specific genre. For almost thirty years, Alyson Books has been publishing LGBT authors, often when no other publisher would dare sign them on. Alyson Books, recently purchased by Regent Media, is the oldest LGBT book-publisher and the first to readily publish gay fiction against the marketing odds. In an interview with Gay and Lesbian Review Worldwide Don Weise talks about the important impact Alyson Books has had in gay and lesbian publishing:

When I look at our backlist and see the first LGBT children's books- Heather Has Two Mommies and Daddy's Roommate, (Note: There have been earlier published LGBT children's books, see When Megan Went Away, and Jenny Lives with Eric and Martin.) or the first African-American gay anthologies- In the Life and Brother to Brother- or the S/M classics Coming to Power and Leatherfolk, I see a publisher with a wide vision of who we are as LGBT people. Taken together, this sampling of books recognizes that some of us are parents, some of us are people of color, and some of us enjoy sex involving BDSM. Some of us might even be all of the above. To my thinking this inclusive view is an extraordinary achievement unto itself. While I could name any number of books that I'm proud to say Alyson has published, I think the barrier-breaking nature of our past is what excites me most.

Other publishing houses have begun to show an interest in gay fiction. LPI Media, also owned by Regent Media, is now the largest gay and lesbian publisher.

== Audience ==
The audience for such books includes both teens and adults, according to Sharyn November, a senior editor at Viking Children's Books/Puffin, who observes that "young adult used to mean books aimed at readers between the ages 16 and 21," but some of these books are now "reaching the 14 plus crowd and ideally crossing over to the adult market," although gay young adult novels are also aimed at children as young as twelve years old.

Gay young adult fiction serves more than just gay teenagers; it offers gay literature to straight adolescents as well. All young adults, defined here as people who are 12 to 18 years old in transition from childhood to adulthood, are struggling with issues of responsible sexual behavior and emergent ideas of self-identity, and all young adults should have access to literature that reflects the reality of their lives, their emotions, their fears and their joys, including gay and lesbian teenagers. Furthermore, as homosexuality becomes more and more acceptable to society at large, or at least more visible, all teenagers are going to know others who are lesbian or gay, whether it is family members, teachers, friends or neighbors.

Nancy St. Clair describes the benefits of including homosexual fiction in adolescent classrooms for both the homosexual and straight students: "For the straight students, the course offers the opportunity to study a culture they are curious about, but which the homophobia, so prevalent in student life, prevents them from freely exploring. My course, then, becomes a mandate to explore that which is taboo for many of them. For lesbian students the unit offers both a validation of their experience and an arena where their voices can be heard."

Yet, given the status of young adults as minors, many topics of interest to them, such as homosexuality, are controversial. As Nancy St. Clair describes in her article: "Adults have been eager to have the genre moralize, to perform a social service, while the adolescent has been eager for an understanding of society and his/her emerging, if continuing sexuality. Still, the decade beginning with the mid-1970s and running to the mid-1980s saw the publication of a second category of novels, ones in which the representation of adolescent homosexuality became increasingly complex and decreasingly moralistic."

Despite the controversy over gay fiction for young adults there is still a need for books dealing with homosexuality for adolescents. Nancy St. Clair argues, "If we as teachers truly believe that literature helps students understand themselves and the issues they face, then we have an obligation to provide our gay students with the same resources as we do other minority students." Public libraries, committed to providing materials to young adults to meet their educational, recreational and social information needs, should collect materials that address these needs.

== Themes ==
USA Today reported that, "No longer do gay young adult novels simply ask, 'Am I gay?' Now they explore how to navigate in the journey for love."

Contemporary gay young adult novels typically involve a teenage protagonist, teen issues, and the first-person point of view. These novels have come to deal with a variety of gay-related issues and themes.

== Recognition ==
The annual Rainbow List is created by the Rainbow Round Table (RRT) of the American Library Association (ALA). This best-of-the-year list is selected by librarians who are members for the RRT.

Another indication, some say, that gay young adult novels have gained wider acceptance in recent years is the fact that, since 1999, four gay-themed books, or books with gay secondary characters, have won the Young Adult Library Services Association's Michael L. Printz Award. This award, named for a Topeka, Kansas school librarian and sponsored by Booklist, a publication of the ALA, is given in recognition of a work that demonstrates literary excellence in young adult literature.

The Lambda Literary Award, which is awarded in recognition of works that celebrate or explore LGBT themes, also recognizes children's/young adult literature.

Other examples of recognition include the ALA's "Best Books for Young Adults" award, whose winners have included Rainbow Boys by Alex Sanchez and Boy Meets Boy by David Levithan.

== See also ==
- Lesbian literature
- List of gay male teen novels
- Gay literature
