= What They Always Tell Us =

2008 novel by Martin Wilson

- Author: Martin Wilson
- Language: English
- Genre: Young adult
- Publisher: Delacorte Books
- Publication date: August 2008
- Publication place: United States
- Media type: Print (Hardback, Paperback)
- Pages: 293
- ISBN: 978-0-375-84892-6
- OCLC: 167492689

What They Always Tell Us is the first novel by Martin Wilson, focusing on the relationship between two high school age brothers as one begins to embrace his homosexuality. The book was a finalist in the Children's/Young Adult category at the 2009 Lambda Literary Awards, but lost to Out of the Pocket by Bill Konigsberg. What They Always Tell Us was also chosen for the ALA's 2009 Rainbow List.

== Plot summary ==
What They Always Tell Us is told from the perspective of two brothers, Alex and James. Alex is a high school junior who struggles with depression; the novel opens a few months after he drank Pine-Sol in an apparent suicide attempt. James is a senior who is presented as the exact opposite of Alex. James is ambitious, popular and athletic. The story takes place over the school year and chronicles the brothers fulfilling school and family obligations, befriending a lost and isolated neighborhood boy, and the brothers repairing their own relationship with one another. The chapters switch back and forth between Alex and James' perspective, giving readers access to both of their thoughts and desires.

== Reception ==
What They Always Tell Us was generally well received by critics. It was selected by Indie Bound (indiebound.org) for the Fall '08 Kids Next List. The Austin Chronicle recommended the book stating it was both ″uplifting″ and ″relevant″. The School Library Journal praised the book's realism, saying it would appeal "to teens who are grappling with decisions about the future, the frustrations of family, and the choices that relationships require of us". Booklist called the book a "strong debut" and that "Wilson shows admirable control of a complicated story that in less-accomplished hands could have spun out of control." Publishers Weekly also reviewed the book, stating it was "insightfully evoked".
