= How I Shed My Skin =

How I Shed My Skin: Unlearning the Racist Lessons of a Southern Childhood
- First edition
- Author: Jim Grimsley
- Language: English
- Genre: Memoir
- Published: April 14, 2015
- Publisher: Algonquin Books
- Publication place: United States
- Pages: 275

How I Shed My Skin: Unlearning the Racist Lessons of a Southern Childhood is a 2015 memoir about author Jim Grimsley's racist white experiences as a white Southerner growing up in the era of desegregation in the Southern United States. The memoir recounts Jim Grimsley's racist white experience growing up and how it isolated his sentimentality with African Americans, then transitioning into a long period of hard change in which Grimsley tries to unlearn the racist lessons of his childhood. The memoir reflects on white superiority, particularly in Southern Virginia.

== Summary ==
In 1966, the public schools in rural Jones County, North Carolina desegregated in response to the "Freedom of Choice Plan". Early in the memoir in the chapter "Black bitch", Jimmy Grimsley, a sixth grader at the time, fired racial epithets at his three African American classmates – Violet, Ursula, and Rhonda. Grimsley is then taken aback when Violet fires back, convinced of her civil rights and standing her own ground. It was the moment when Grimsley began to realize the layers under his racist remarks, starting to question the racial hierarchy existing within the social system.

Grimsley remembers how he rendered black people practically "invisible" to him, thinking that having white skin made him superior to those with black skin. He recalls how he was taught to maintain that separation of skin difference in any circumstance.

Later moving into Pollocksville, Grimsley then recounts his fruitful experience. Having access to an immense collection of books in the Pollocksville local library, he read a variety of books and on one occasion, catching his eye on the magazine Ebony. Startled by the way black people were depicted in the magazine, Grimsley begins to develop an understanding that black people are no different to white people.

Grimsley digs out the roots behind his naiveté judgements and remarks, bringing up his childhood experience. In chapter "The Learning, he unearths what he believes as "naturalized" racism in childhood nursery rhymes, and emphasizes in the "Divinely White", how religion plays a role in maintaining white supremacy. He notes how jokes told by his father and friends were based on black inferiority, repetitively asserting racial dominance.

In the chapter "Protests", Grimsley notes the time where his teacher Mr. Taylor noted that black people were the "scum of the earth". He goes on to question why people always have the need to assert their superiority. Using these examples, Grimsley explains how the racist ideology was formed.

The memoir ends on present day in the chapter "Reunion" where Grimsley shows up to the forty year reunion of his Class of 1973, which he notes that only one other white classmate shows up to.
