= Nikki Blonsky =

American actress (born 1988)

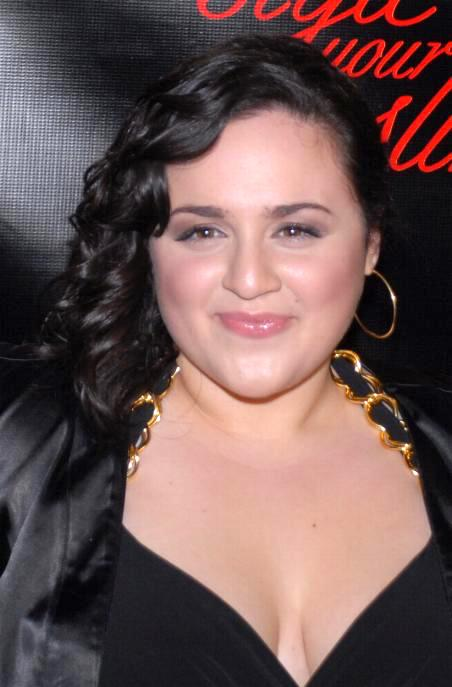
- Blonsky in 2008
- Born: Nicole Blonsky; November 9, 1988 (age 38); Great Neck, New York, U.S.
- Occupation: Actress
- Years active: 2007–present
- Spouse: Hailey Jo Jenson (m. 2023)

Nicole Blonsky (born November 9, 1988) is an American actress. She is best known for playing Tracy Turnblad in the film Hairspray (2007), for which she won two Critics' Choice Awards and nominations for a Golden Globe Award and a Screen Actors Guild Award.

Blonsky has also starred as Willamena Rader in the ABC Family series Huge (2010), for which she received a Teen Choice Award nomination, had a recurring role as Margot on the series Smash (2013), and had roles in the films Geography Club (2013) as Therese and The Last Movie Star (2017) as Faith.

== Early life ==
Blonsky was born and raised in Great Neck, New York. She and her brother Joey are the children of Karen, a school aide, and Carl Blonsky, a municipal worker for the village water pollution control district. Her father is Jewish, and her mother is Roman Catholic.

Blonsky attended Great Neck North Middle School and attended John L. Miller Great Neck North High School, and switched to Village School after a year at the latter. She additionally attended the after-school theatre program at William A. Shine Great Neck South High School daily, where she participated in productions of Les Misérables, Sweeney Todd, Kiss Me, Kate, and the title role of the opera Carmen.

== Career ==
Blonsky made her screen debut as Tracy Turnblad in the musical feature film Hairspray, which is an adaptation of the musical of the same name. She auditioned for the role as a high-school student with no professional acting or singing background at the time, and beat out 1100 candidates. The film was released to commercial and critical success, and became Blonsky's first role. She received praise for her performance, with Roger Ebert of The Chicago Sun-Times writing "Without somebody like Nikki Blonsky at the heart of the movie, it might fall flat, but everybody works at her level of happiness..." She received several awards and nominations, including winning two Critics' Choice Awards for Best Young Actress and Best Acting Ensemble, and being nominated for the Golden Globe Award for Best Actress and the Screen Actors Guild Award for Outstanding Performance by a Cast in a Motion Picture.

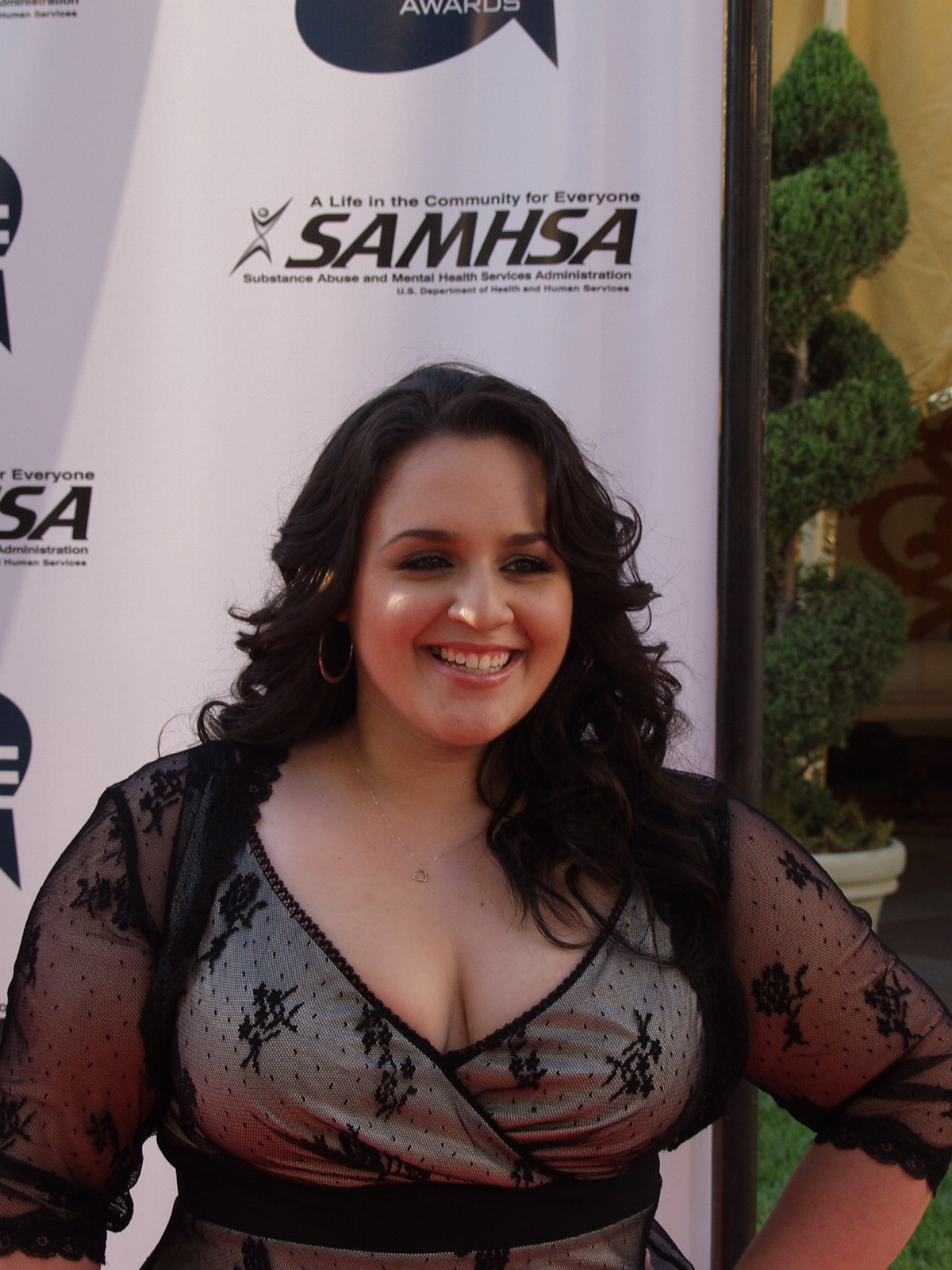
Blonsky at the 2008 Voice Awards

On June 22, 2008, she sang The Star-Spangled Banner in the pre-race ceremony at the 2008 Toyota/Save Mart 350 at Infineon Raceway. Blonsky also co-starred in the MTV mystery series Valemont in 2009. In 2010, Blonsky co-starred with Raven Goodwin in the short lived ABC Family series Huge, which premiered in June 2010, and ran for one season. Entertainment Weekly described her as the show's "great asset" and praised her for having "the delicate skill to make Will’s anger take the forms of both sincerity and a funny sarcasm." For Huge, she received a nomination for a Teen Choice Award.

In 2011, Blonsky earned a cosmetology license, and began working part-time as a hairstylist and make-up artist in her hometown of Great Neck, New York, between acting auditions. In 2013, Blonsky appeared in two episodes of the NBC Broadway drama series Smash. Later that year, she appeared in the film adaptation of the book Geography Club. The film received mixed reviews, however she and the cast were nominated for an award at the ShoWest Convention in 2014.

Blonsky appeared Off-Broadway in the play Stuffed by Lisa Lampanelli at the Westside Theatre in October 2017 to November 2017.

Blonsky saw a resurgence of interest in her career in 2025 following a TikTok trend involving her appearances on Cameo.

== Personal life ==
Blonsky's first boyfriend was Hairspray co-star Anthony Carr.

In June 2020, Blonsky came out as a lesbian in a video posted to the social media site TikTok set to the song "I'm Coming Out" by Diana Ross. In 2022, Blonsky announced her engagement to her partner Hailey Jo Jenson. They were married on October 21, 2023.

=== Legal issues ===
In July 2008, Blonsky and her parents were involved in an aggravated confrontation with the family of Bianca Golden, a former contestant on America's Next Top Model, at the Providenciales International Airport in Turks and Caicos over saved seats in the airport departure lounge. Golden and Blonsky were charged with actual bodily harm and Blonsky's father with grievous bodily harm, a felony. That December, the charges against Blonsky and Golden were dropped. It has been alleged by Golden that the altercation was racially motivated and involved racist remarks, but this is vehemently denied by Blonsky, who remarked in an Instagram story: "I am deeply saddened and hurt to hear I have been wrongly accused of ever having anything other than love in my heart for someone of a different race, when that couldn't be further from the truth".

== Filmography ==
=== Film ===
Year	Title	Role	Notes
2007	Hairspray	Tracy Turnblad	
2008	Harold	Rhonda Baxter	
2010	Waiting for Forever	Dolores	
2013	The English Teacher	Sheila Nussbaum	
2013	Geography Club	Therese	
2014	Membership Has Its Privileges: Making Geography Club	Self	Short
2016	Pup Star	Lady Paw Paw (voice)	
2017	The Last Movie Star	Faith Cole	
2017	Pup Star: Better 2Gether	Lady Paw Paw (voice)	
2018	Pup Star: World Tour	Lady Paw Paw (voice)	
2019	Ghost in the Graveyard	Mrs. E	
2023	Oblivious	The Voice	
2024	Bosco	Tammy	

=== Television ===
Year	Title	Role	Notes
2007-2025	Entertainment Tonight	Self	18
2008	Queen Sized	Maggie Baker	Television film
2009	Ugly Betty	Teri	Episode: "Dressed for Success"
2009	Ace of Cakes	Herself	Episode: "The Eagle Has Landed"
2009	The Real Housewives of New York City	Herself	Episode: "The Lost Footage"
2009	Valemont	Poppy	Main role
2010	Huge	Willamena Rader	Main role
2010	The Wendy Williams Show	Self	Episode: "Episode dated 4 August 2010"
2011	The Fresh Beat Band	MC Freeze	Episode: "Dance Floor Superhero"
2011	Rocco's Dinner Party	Herself	Episode: "Runway Ready"
2013	Smash	Margot	2 episodes
2013	Oprah: Where Are They Now?	Self	Episode: "Snooki/'80s Heartthrob Willie Aames/Nikki Blonsky/Lottery Winners"
2013	From Broadway with Love: A Benefit Concert for Sandy Hook	Self	TV special
2015	Q and A	Self	Episode: "You Can't Stop Nikki Blonsky"
2020	Quarantine	Billie Sykes	Episode: "Day 44"
2021	Life Unfiltered		Episode: "Bullying and Body Shaming"
2021	Hollywood Disclosure with Serena DC	Self	Episode: "Nikki Blonsky"
2023	Every Breath She Takes	Maria Bonilla	Television film

=== Podcasts ===
Year	Title	Role	Notes
2018	Everything Iconic with Danny Pellegrino	Self	Episode: "36 A Night at Les Deux w/ The Hills' Kristin Cavallari, Mean Girls' Daniel Franzese, O-Town's Ashley Parker Angel, and Hairspray's Nikki Blonsky"
2020	Pop Culture Unplugged w/ Elias	Self	Episode: "Interview: Nikki Blonsky"
2021	Thanks for Coming In	Self	Episode: "43. Nikki Blonsky"
2022	Mayim Bialik's Breakdown	Self	Episode: "Nikki Blonsky, Go Be You"
2023	A Voice in Violet	Charlotte	6 episodes

== Awards and nominations ==
Year	Award	Category	Work	Result	Ref.
2007	Alliance of Women Film Journalists	Best Newcomer	Hairspray	Nominated	
2007	Critics' Choice Awards	Best Young Actress	Hairspray	Won	
2007	Critics' Choice Awards	Best Acting Ensemble	Hairspray	Won	
2007	Hollywood Film Awards	Ensemble of the Year	Hairspray	Won	
2007	Young Hollywood Awards	One To Watch	Hairspray	Won	
2008	Golden Globe Awards	Best Actress, Musical or Comedy	Hairspray	Nominated	
2008	Online Film Critics Society Awards	Best Breakthrough Performance	Hairspray	Won	
2008	Screen Actors Guild Awards	Outstanding Performance by a Cast in a Motion Picture	Hairspray	Nominated	
2008	Palm Springs International Film Festival Awards	Ensemble Cast Award	Hairspray	Won	
2008	Palm Springs International Film Festival Awards	Rising Star Award	Hairspray	Won	
2010	Teen Choice Awards	Choice Summer TV Star: Female	Huge	Nominated	
2014	ShoWest Convention	Ensemble Award	Geography Club	Nominated	
