= Rainbow High (book) =

Second novel in a trilogy by Alex Sánchez

- Front cover of Rainbow High
- Author: Alex Sánchez
- Language: English
- Series: Rainbow trilogy
- Genre: Young adult
- Publisher: Simon & Schuster Children's Publishing
- Publication date: November 2003
- Publication place: United States
- Media type: Print (Hardback, Paperback)
- Pages: 272 pp
- ISBN: 978-0-689-85477-4
- OCLC: 52203415
- Preceded by: Rainbow Boys
- Followed by: Rainbow Road

Rainbow High is the second novel in the Rainbow trilogy by Mexican American author Alex Sánchez, focusing on the issues gay and questioning youth face as they come of age. This book is the sequel to Rainbow Boys and is followed by Rainbow Road.

== Plot summary ==
It is the final semester of Jason Carillo's, Kyle Meeks's, and Nelson Glassman's senior year of high school. In the beginning they write letters expressing their past experiences and their current issues. They face the issues of coming out to the public, deciding which college to go to, and the ever-present threat of HIV/AIDS.

=== Nelson Glassman ===
Nelson is relieved to discover he does not have HIV, but his boyfriend Jeremy is HIV-positive. Nelson thinks Jeremy is pushing him away when Jeremy is just afraid of infecting Nelson. Nelson's mother keeps wanting to meet Jeremy and approves of their romantic relationship until she discovers that he is positive. After a while, Nelson suspects Jeremy wants to break up with him, so decides to break up with Jeremy first. They meet in a cafe and Nelson still is undecided about breaking up with Jeremy but eventually Jeremy decides to break up their relationship. Nelson is hurt when Jeremy is immediately content with the idea. Jeremy and Nelson stay friends (or try to), and go to the prom on a platonic date. He is also upset because his best friend Kyle might be going to Princeton without him, leaving him to go to Tech (a boring, nerdy school in his opinion) alone. He feels insecure about his loneliness and his friends, and feels a little left out sometimes. Nelson ultimately decides to not go to Tech since he wants to figure out what he wants to do with his life.

=== Kyle Meeks ===
Kyle faces the problem of deciding which college to go to: Princeton or Tech. Jason may be going to Tech, so Kyle invests his hope in the possibility of going to Tech with him and his best friend Nelson. He encourages Jason to come out and hopes that he and Jason will be able to be open about their relationship. There are also problems on the swim team when someone has their parent write a letter to the coach saying that they don't want to shower with a homosexual, forcing Kyle to wait until he gets home to shower. When the team stays in a hotel for a big swim meet, Kyle gets upset when his teammates refuse to share a room with him and almost walks out of frustration. Coach threatens to take him out of the meet and calls Kyle's father. Kyle apologizes (his father has told him to) and he is able to swim in the meet. Later Kyle's father talks to the swim Coach and defends his son and his son's homosexuality. In the end, Kyle decides to go to Princeton, and goes to the prom with Jason.

=== Jason Carrillo ===
Jason wants to come out to the team but is afraid that he will lose his scholarship from Tech. He tells his Coach who handles it very well and so does the team. The team wins state. Jason and Debra have a civil conversation. Jason's confused on why Kyle would give up Princeton for him. He doesn't want Kyle to throw his life away. Jason gives a TV interview about his homosexuality and when asked if he has a boyfriend, he says no. Kyle is upset about this. When the team wins state, he and Kyle kiss on the court which makes up for the interview. Jason's mother is still having a hard time accepting his sexuality. Tech takes his scholarship away saying that it was due to an altercation earlier that year. Jason thinks that this is false. He and Kyle finally go to the prom together. Then he and Kyle have sex together.

== Reception ==
Publishers Weekly reviewed the novel positively stating that "[t]he author expertly mixes coming-out issues with the universal complications of first love." While Kirkus predicted that the "[f]ans of the first book will enjoy this second helping of sometimes-melodramatic soapy goodness."
