= Robin Reardon =

American novelist

Robin Reardon is an American novelist who writes stories about gay teens.

== Biography ==
Robin Reardon is the author of the novels A Secret Edge, Thinking Straight, A Question of Manhood, The Evolution of Ethan Poe, The Revelations of Jude Connor, Educating Simon, Throwing Stones, and Waiting for Walker. Reardon has contributed works to two non-profit efforts: Awake, now out of print, an anthology edited by Tracey Pennington and benefiting The Trevor Project, which is an organization dedicated to ending suicide among LGBTQ youth (Reardon's story was A Line In the Sand); and The Real Story Safe Sex Project, organized by author Brent Hartinger (Reardon's story is Giuseppe and Me).

All of Reardon's novels deal with the concerns and lives of homosexual teens. Her novel A Secret Edge was the finalist for the 2008 Lambda Literary Award, and The Evolution of Ethan Poe garnered 2012 American Library Association Rainbow List designation and won five categories in the 2011 Rainbow Awards. Educating Simon received Honorable Mention in the 2014 Rainbow Awards, and Throwing Stones won Honorable Mention in the 2016 Rainbow Awards.

Reardon published an essay, "The Case for Acceptance: An Open Letter To Humanity", which presents the rationale and process by which assumptions about sexual orientation can be examined in light of science and reason, and it presents a strategic approach to scripture that leaves it intact while bringing it into contemporary life.

Reardon resides in the Boston, Massachusetts, area.

== Writing style ==
The theme underlying all of Robin Reardon's work is this: The only thing wrong with being gay is how some people treat you when they find out. Although Readon's work focuses on teens whose sexual identities are other than simple heterosexual, her writing goal is to tell stories about people, some of whom happen not to be straight/heterosexual: in other words, stories about people in all their diversity. Toward this end, Readon's books typically introduce subject matter outside of what a reader might expect from books primarily about gay teens.

In Educating Simon, for example, readers will learn about Asperger syndrome (which was pulled under the umbrella term autism spectrum disorder in 2013 by the Diagnostic and Statistical Manual of Mental Disorders (DSM-5). They will also learn about the social movement called Straight Edge, about the ancient meditational practice involving the labyrinth (and how the labyrinth differs from the maze), and about the 20th-century artist Clyfford Still.

Thinking Straight presents the reader with an insider's view of "ex-gay" (or reparative therapy) efforts practiced by some branches of Evangelical Christianity. The novel was inspired by the story of a Memphis teen named Zack Stark, who in 2005 was put into Restoration Path, also known as Love In Action/Refuge (LIA/R; no longer in existence as of 2012)) by his parents to teach him how to "pray away the gay". The fictional Straight to God in Reardon's novel follows many of the guidelines from the LIA/R counselor's handbook.

Throwing Stones depicts the interactions between a small, mostly Christian town and a community of Pagans, introducing readers who are unfamiliar with Paganism to some aspects of that religious practice and philosophy.

Reardon broke new ground for her writing with Waiting for Walker by introducing an intersex character. As of the 2017 publication of this novel, there were very few other works of fiction touching on the issue of intersex.

Reardon often tackles unusual themes and subplots in her stories. In On The Precipice, for example, a central character is an individual who uses a wheelchair. Reardon relied on a subject matter expert for this aspect (Stevie Maria Jonak, who also wrote a foreword). In For Love Of God, in which the main character is a gay man who feels called to the Episcopal priesthood, Reardon had the guidance of The Reverend Reid D. Farrell, who wrote a foreword to that work.

== Bibliography ==
=== Novels ===
- A Secret Edge (2007) Finalist, 2008, Lambda Literary Foundation
- Thinking Straight (2008)
- A Question of Manhood (2010)
- The Evolution of Ethan Poe (2011)
- Educating Simon (2014)
- Throwing Stones (2015)
- Waiting for Walker (2017) Honorable Mention and associated cash prize, 3rd Annual North Street Book Contest / Winning Writers
- And If I Fall(2018)
- On Chocorua: Book 1 of the Trailblazer series (2019) Pencraft Awards Literary Excellence 1st Place
- On The Kalalau Trail: Book 2 of the Trailblazer series (2019)
- On The Precipice: Book 3 of the Trailblazer series (2020)
- For Love Of God: Book 1 of the Blessed Be series (2022) Listed in Q Spirit's top LGBTQ Christian Books of 2022

=== Short works of fiction ===
- A Line in the Sand (from the out-of-print collection Awake) (2011)
- Giuseppe and Me (2014)

=== Essay ===
- The Case for Acceptance: An Open Letter to Humanity (2014)
