= Geography Club =

Book by Brent Hartinger

- First edition cover
- Author: Brent Hartinger
- Language: English
- Series: Russel Middlebrook
- Genre: Young adult fiction
- Publisher: HarperCollins
- Publication date: March 4, 2003
- Publication place: United States
- Pages: 226 (trade paperback)
- ISBN: 0-06-001223-4
- OCLC: 55065943
- Followed by: The Order of the Poison Oak

Geography Club is a 2003 young adult novel by American author Brent Hartinger. It is the first book in The Russel Middlebrook Series. The novel follows a group of high school students who feel like outsiders, some because of their sexual orientations. The narrator, Russel Middlebrook, then finds himself helping his friend Min to form an after-school club for the students, so that they can hang out together for support.

The novel received mostly favorable reviews. Publishers Weekly noted that "Hartinger credibly captures high school pressure and intolerance . . . Overall, this novel does a fine job of presenting many of the complex realities of gay teen life, and also what it takes to be a 'thoroughly decent' person."

Writing in the Detroit Free Press, Ellen Creager wrote: "Hartinger can write. The account of Russel fending off a girl who likes him and pining over a jock with a secret is beautifully written and funny. For gay teens, it is a warm, welcoming kind of book. That said, it also may make a straight audience squirm."

In a review in The Gazette (Cedar Rapids, Iowa), Dori Hillestad Butler said the novel "is not an in-your-face book about gay teens, but it does capture perfectly the loneliness and isolation that gay teens feel. In fact, it's a good book for anyone who's ever felt completely alone."

== Plot ==
Russel Middlebrook is keeping a secret from his two best friends, Min, a bright Chinese American girl, and Gunnar, a bright and socially awkward boy. Neither of them knows he is gay and that he has been visiting an internet chat room to chat with other gay teens. When he discovers another Alliance group for support. The group meets and decides on the Geography Club name to keep it private.

At school Gunnar, who is unaware of Russel's sexuality, persuades Russel to go on a double date with him and two popular girls from their school. Russel is reluctant to go on the date but agrees to do it for Gunnar, as this would be the only way for him to go on a date. When Gunnar and Russel go on their double date, Gunnar is happy but Russel only puts up with it for his friend's sake. Russel's date tries to have sex with him and he puts her off by saying he's a virgin and he wants his first time to be special.

Russel joins the school baseball team so he can be part of Kevin's crowd. Russel plays well and wins a game for his team. Russel persuades Kevin to come to the Geography Club meeting. At school, Kevin and his jock friends make fun of the school outcast Brian Bund and Russel joins in. Min sees this and is disgusted. Brian wants to join the Geography Club but Kevin and Russel vote against this. Min wanted to let him join and is angry with Russel for voting with Kevin. Min suggests they make the club public, making Kevin and Terese nervous. Terese breaks up with Min.

Gunnar persuades Russel to go on a second double date with the girls, this time at a cabin outside town. Russel is again pressured for sex and when Gunnar refuses to drive him home, Russel storms off. He phones Kevin who drives out to get him and they end up making out.

When rumors are spread by his unhappy date and her friend saying about a gay kid wanting to start a Gay/Straight Alliance, and that it must be Russel because he wouldn't make out with the girl. Kevin starts avoiding him. By lunchtime, Russell has nowhere to sit in the cafeteria except by Brian, as they are now both outcasts. Brian writes in an application for a Gay-Straight club making people think he's the "gay kid". Russel asks Brian whether he's gay, and Brian says No but he doesn't want others to get treated like he is. The Geography Club resumes meeting this time seeking more open membership as an official club. After a showdown with the principal, approval is given and a liaison teacher appointed. Gunnar apologizes to Russel and says he always knew he must be gay and he's sorry he pushed him into dates. Kevin isn't willing to be out and he ends his romance with Russel.

== Adaptations ==
Hartinger later adapted his novel into a play, Geography Club.

Huffington Pictures' Geography Club was filmed in June 2012 with Michael Huffington and Anthony Bretti producing, Frederick Levy and Bryan Leder executive producing. Starring Cameron Deane Stewart, Justin Deeley, Andrew Caldwell, Allie Gonino, Meaghan Martin, Ally Maki, Nikki Blonsky, Alex Newell, Grant Harvey, Dexter Darden, Teo Olivares, Marin Hinkle, Ana Gasteyer, and Scott Bakula.

Geography Club was theatrically released in the United States by Breaking Glass Pictures on November 15, 2013. The DVD was released on March 25, 2014.

== See also ==
- Gay male teen fiction
- Lesbian teen fiction
