= Openly Straight =

Book by Bill Konigsberg

- First edition
- Author: Bill Konigsberg
- Language: English
- Genre: Young adult, romance, drama, LGBT, coming of age
- Publisher: Arthur A. Levine Books
- Publication date: May 28, 2013
- Publication place: United States
- Media type: Print (hardcover and paperback), e-book, audiobook
- ISBN: 0-545-79865-5
- Followed by: Honestly Ben

Openly Straight is a 2013 young adult novel and the second book by American author Bill Konigsberg. The coming-of-age story focuses on high school junior Rafe who has been openly gay since he was in the eighth grade. When he switches to a private all boys high school across the country in Massachusetts he decides to hide his sexuality from his new classmates. The novel has been translated into German, Vietnamese, and Portuguese.

== Synopsis ==
When Rafe switches to a private all boys high school in Natick, he decides to hide the fact that he is gay, hoping to find a new identity as just Rafe and not just ‘that gay kid’. In an attempt to live a life without labels, Rafe is immediately taken in by the jocks for his soccer abilities. Rafe relishes in being allowed to be a jock and being treated normally in the locker room. Rafe finds a best friend and potential boyfriend called Ben. However, Ben is straight and has no idea about Rafe being gay.

== Awards and nominations ==
The novel won the Sid Fleischman Award for Humor in 2014 and was a finalist for the Amelia Elizabeth Walden Award. It also made YALSA's Best Fiction for Young Adults list for 2014; the American Library Association Rainbow List; The Texas Library Association's Tayshas List (as a top ten title); and was nominated for the Georgia Peach Award.

== Sequel ==
In March 2016, Konigsberg released the sequel Honestly Ben, which features Ben as the protagonist. It received three starred reviews: from Publishers Weekly, Booklist, and School Library Journal. Both novels in the series were released as audio books that month, too.
