= Rainbow Boys =

2001 book by Alex Sánchez

- Front cover of Rainbow Boys
- Author: Alex Sánchez
- Language: English
- Series: Rainbow trilogy
- Genre: Young adult
- Publisher: Simon & Schuster Children's Publishing
- Publication date: October 2001
- Publication place: United States
- Media type: Print (Hardback, Paperback)
- Pages: 256 pp
- ISBN: 978-0-689-84100-2
- OCLC: 82005538
- Followed by: Rainbow High

Rainbow Boys is the first novel in a trilogy by Alex Sánchez, focusing on the issues gay and questioning youth face as they come of age. This book is followed by Rainbow High and Rainbow Road.

== Plot summary ==
The story follows the overlapping lives of three high school seniors, with the chapters alternating between their different points of view. Jason Carrillo, the popular jock, finds himself questioning his sexuality and decides to attend a meeting for gay youth. He does not expect to see his classmates Kyle Meeks and Nelson Glassman at the meeting. Afterwards, Kyle, the mostly-closeted swimmer, decides to help tutor Jason in math. It is revealed that Kyle has had a crush on Jason for the past three years of high school. They bond over their shared feelings towards coming out and their families, which leads them to become more than friends. Nelson, the flamboyant class clown, has conflicting feelings towards Kyle and their relationship. He's very close to his mother who claims to have always known about his homosexuality, but rarely sees his father. After getting into an argument with Kyle, he decides to hook up with an online stranger named Brick. He has sex for the first time, and fears he has contracted HIV since Brick didn't use a condom. He becomes friends with HIV-positive Jeremy, and they begin a relationship.

== Characters ==
Jason, the first character introduced in the novel, is a jock struggling to accept his suspected bisexuality. At the beginning, he insists to himself that he is in love with his girlfriend, Debra, but later begins to question this and his overall sexuality. Not only is he afraid of consequences for being bisexual at school, but at home as well. His father is an abusive alcoholic and extremely homophobic, and has beaten and taunted Jason throughout his life. It's also revealed that Jason had feelings for his childhood best friend Tommy, but never saw him again after his father caught them touching each other. Besides his sexuality, Jason struggles with his slim chances of going to college.

Kyle is a shy senior, already beginning to accept his sexuality. He is best friends with Nelson, a stereotypical flamboyant gay teenager, whose sexuality is well known. As the book progresses, he eventually comes out to his parents, and is more open about being gay. At one point in the book, he even spray paints the words "and proud!" following the graffiti on his locker which reads "queer". He'd been crushing on Jason since freshman year, but finally befriends him after Jason asks for his help in math. As their friendship grows, Jason realizes he returns Kyle's feelings, and they start a relationship. He has an overall nerdy appearance at the beginning of the book, but gets his braces removed and starts wearing contacts.

Nelson is the most "flamboyant" or extremely gay of the three main characters, referring to himself as a "queen" and dyeing his hair bright colors. He is brutally bullied at school for being different, but has gotten used to it over the years. He befriends Kyle in ninth grade, and they become best friends. Once Kyle and Jason get together, Nelson gets jealous and tries to find a boy for himself. Eventually he meets a guy named Brick over the Internet and meets up with him in real life. They end up having unprotected sex and Nelson is now worried that he might have contracted HIV. Later on, still without a test result, he meets an HIV-positive boy named Jeremy, and they start a relationship.

== Adaptations ==
Based on Sanchez' novel, Rainbow Boys: The Movie (เรนโบว์บอยส์ เดอะมูฟวี่), a Thai-language film directed by Thanyatorn Siwanukrow, was released in 2005. Water Bearer Films released the DVD in 2008 under the title Right by Me.

== Reception ==
Sanchez recalls that he did not have a particular audience in mind when he wrote Rainbow Boys; however, when he sent it to his agent, she told him that it would be well suited for young people. And it turned out to be incredibly revolutionary for young adult literature. Sanchez notes that prior to Rainbow Boys, hardly any young adult novels featured LGBTQ characters, and if they did, they were often “lonely and isolated”. For many LGBTQ adolescents still trying to find their voice and identity, a book that focuses on LGBTQ friendship and love was well needed.

Publishers Weekly notes that while the novel may seem to have an “educational agenda” by including names of support groups and listing contact information for LGBTQ organizations at the end of the book, the characters and their struggles feel well developed. It's a well written coming of age novel that has enough drama, humor, and feelings to hold an adolescents’ attention, while holding a message and giving some helpful resources.

While the Rainbow Boys series has been praised by both critics and scholars for its positive portrayal of gay characters, Thomas Crisp has drawn attention to several of its themes that are still problematic. Most notably, despite the novel's focus on gay relationships, it continues to propagate heteronormative gender roles.
