= Martin Wilson (writer) =

American writer (born 1973)

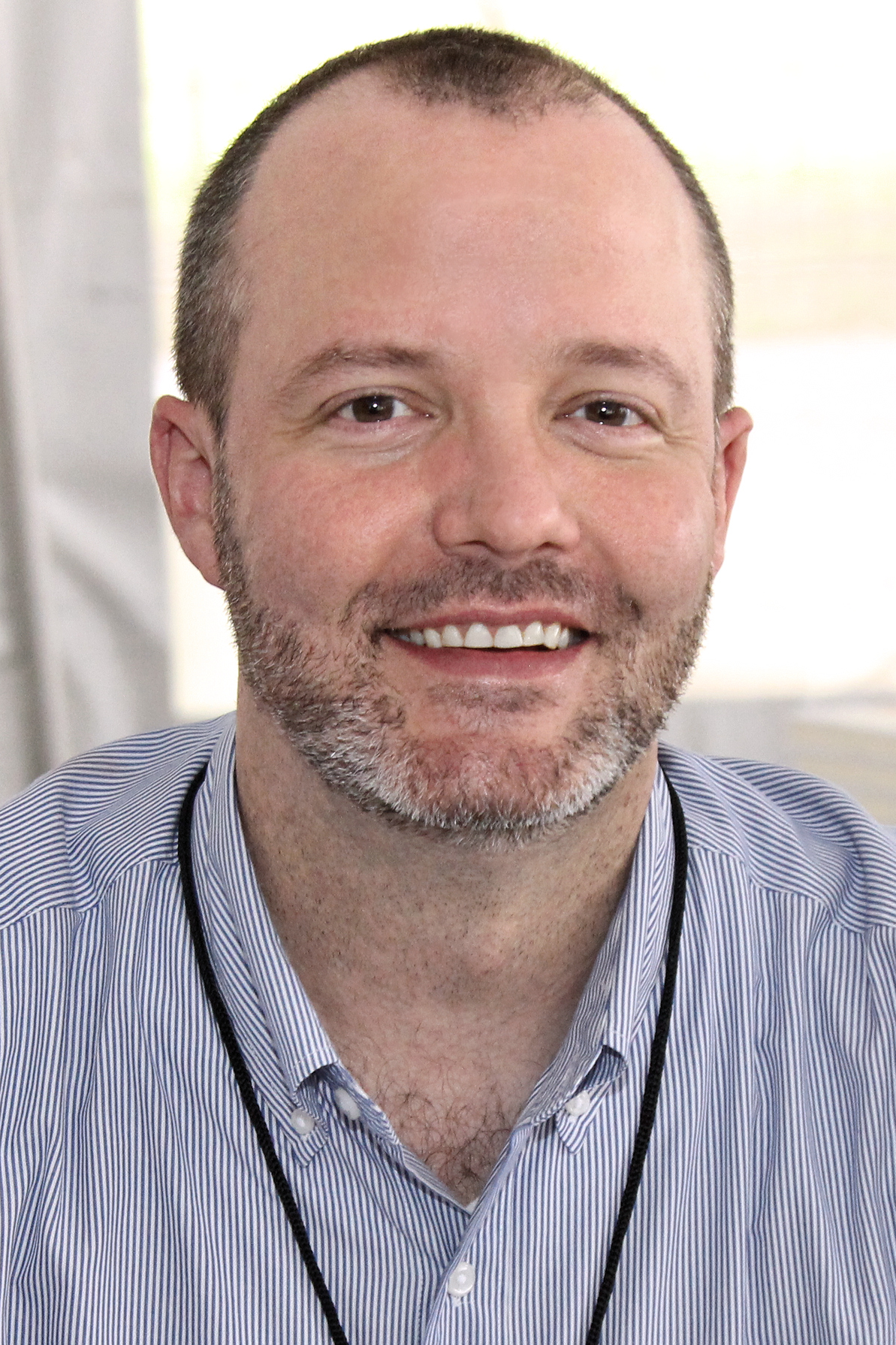
- Wilson at the 2017 Texas Book Festival
- Born: 1973 (age 52–53); Tuscaloosa, Alabama, U.S.
- Education: Vanderbilt University; University of Florida
- Occupation: Writer
- Website: www.martinwilsonwrites.com

Martin Wilson (born 1973 in Tuscaloosa, Alabama) is an American writer. He is best known for his award-winning debut novel What They Always Tell Us, published in 2008.

A graduate of Vanderbilt University and the University of Florida, he is currently based in New York City, where he works in marketing and publicity for HarperCollins.

What They Always Tell Us won an Alabama Author Award for best young adult book, and was a nominee for children's/young adult literature category at the 2009 Lambda Literary Awards. The novel was also an Indie Next Selection, an ALA-ALSC Rainbow List Selection, and a CCBC Choices Book. His second novel, We Now Return to Regular Life, was published in 2017.

Wilson has also published short stories. In 2010, he contributed an essay about John Donovan's influential LGBT teen novel I'll Get There. It Better Be Worth the Trip to the 2010 book The Lost Library: Gay Fiction Rediscovered.
