= Pioneer Summer =

Book series

- Russian language first edition cover
- Authors: Katerina Silvanova; Elena Malisova
- Original title: Лето в пионерском галстуке
- Language: Russian
- Publisher: Popcorn Books
- Publication date: 2021

Pioneer Summer (Russian: Лето в пионерском галстуке, romanized: Leto v pionerskom galstuke, lit. 'Summer in a Pioneer Tie') is the first book of a coming-of-age book series co-written by a Ukrainian-Russian duo Katerina Silvanova and Elena Malisova. The series has gained significant attention for its compelling narrative and its portrayal of LGBTQ+ themes within the context of the Soviet Union. The books have experienced both critical acclaim and controversy since their publication by independent publisher Popcorn Books.

== Background ==
The series began with the online publication of Pioneer Summer on the CIS fanfiction website Ficbook.net. The novel initially had a small but devoted fan base before being discovered and published by Popcorn Books, an independent publisher focusing on queer fiction. The books quickly gained popularity among teens and young adults before garnering a significant adult following as well. The novel sold over 200,000 copies in the first six months since its release in late 2021.

== Books in the series ==
Pioneer Summer (Лето в пионерском галстуке): The first book in the series tells the story of Yura (Yury Ilych Konev), a shy 16-year-old who attends a Young Pioneer camp in the Ukrainian Soviet Socialist Republic in the summer of 1986, and Volodya (Vladimir Lvovich Davydov), an 18-year-old undergraduate who serves as Yura's group leader. As the two boys fall in love and tentatively discover their sexuality, they face danger and the risk of a five-year prison sentence if their relationship is discovered. The novel explores themes of love, loss, and identity in a rapidly changing society. It became the top-selling fiction book in Russia in 2022.

Silence of the Swallow (О чём молчит Ласточка): The sequel to Pioneer Summer. Silence of the Swallow continues the story of Yura and Volodya twenty years later. The book was a critical and commercial success, selling over 100,000 copies in just two months. However, the Russian Parliament banned the book in December 2022 (along with the first novel) due to the adoption of a new law that prohibits 'gay propaganda' targeting not only children but also adults. On Patreon, the two authors have released a revisited version in two books: Silence of the Swallow (Молчание ласточки) and Symphony of Black Water (Симфония чёрной воды).

Symphony of Black Water (Симфония чёрной воды): The sequel to Silence of the Swallow. Published as an ebook distributed via Patreon.

== Reception ==
Pioneer Summer and its sequel gained a large following on social media platforms like TikTok (specifically the sub-community BookTok), where fans created content to express their admiration for the story and characters. The platform saw a surge of fan-made videos, including emotional reactions to the book's ending and various creative tributes. The novel has been described as a "straightforward" and "sensitively written" story that tenderly depicts the relationship between Yura and Volodya, as well as the process of falling in love for the first time.

== Controversy ==
The books' popularity attracted the attention of Russian Parliament officials and anti-LGBTQ+ activists, who began a campaign to ban the books due to their content. The authors faced death threats and were forced to leave Russia. The controversy surrounding the series sparked an ongoing debate about freedom of expression and LGBTQ+ representation in literature. Critics argue that the recent legislative crackdown on LGBTQ+ rights and free speech in Russia (such as the recent Article 6.21) has created a chilling effect on publishing and threatens the few rights that remain in the country.

As a response to the crackdown, some publishers and bookshops have started to self-censor, removing potentially risky content and books like Pioneer Summer from their shelves. The broad and ambiguous nature of the recent legislation has left many in the publishing industry uncertain about which works will be targeted.

Despite these setbacks, Malisova and Silvanova remain committed to sharing their work with their readers. The authors believe that their audience will find ways to access the books despite the restrictive legislation.

In November 2024, the Lukashenko regime added the book to the "list of printed publications containing information messages and materials, the distribution of which could harm the national interests of Belarus".
