= Alex London =

American author (born 1980)

- Born: 1980 (age 45–46); Baltimore, Maryland, U.S.
- Education: Gilman School; Columbia University; Pratt Institute
- Occupation: Author
- Writing career
- Pen name: Charles London; C. Alexander London

Alex London (who has also published under the names Charles London and C. Alexander London) is an American author for children and young adults, and adults, having authored picture books, middle grade and young fiction, as well as adult nonfiction. He has worked as a journalist and human rights researcher reporting from conflict zones and refugee camps, a young adult librarian with New York Public Library, and a snorkel salesman. He lives with his husband and daughter in Philadelphia, Pennsylvania.

== Early life and education ==
Alex London was born in 1980 in Baltimore, Maryland and attended the Gilman School. He graduated in 2002 from Columbia University, where he studied philosophy. In 2010, he earned a master's degree in library and information science from Pratt Institute.

== Career ==
London has published in a variety of genres (fantasy, science fiction, historical fiction, contemporary, and nonfiction), working with several of the Big Five publishing houses including Scholastic, Penguin Random House, Macmillan, and HarperCollins. His books have sold an estimated 2.5 million copies around the world and been translated into 7 languages, as well as being optioned for film and television.

At the inaugural BookCon in 2014, he conducted the opening keynote conversation with best-selling YA author Veronica Roth.

London worked as a research associate for Refugees International while researching the book that would become One Day the Soldiers Came, and served as a Truman National Security Project Fellow in 2009. In 2015, he was appointed to the board of YALLFest, a young adult literature festival in Charleston, SC.

== LGBTQ representation ==
His 2013 young adult novel, Proxy, was one of the only mainstream dystopian YA novels during the dystopian boom of the 2010s to feature a gay protagonist.

In a 2016 essay, he explored why it was important to him to be out as a gay author in the children's book space, and he has been noted for the inclusion of the LGBTQ+ characters and themes in his diverse array of stories.

His 2018 novel, Black Wings Beating, received starred reviews from Kirkus and School Library Journal, which recommended it for "all libraries that serve teens". The New York Times called it "wondrous" and it was an NBC Today Show Pick, which Isaac Fitzgerald called "a YA fantasy unlike any you’ve read before". It was a Rainbow List Selection, a Kirkus Best Young Adult Fantasy of 2018 selection, a Seventeen Magazine best of 2018 pick, a Paste Magazine best of 2018 pick, and We Need Diverse Books 2018 Must Read.

In 2022, he helped write an author letter against book banning that was read into the record by Congressman Jamie Raskin.

In 2023, YouTuber Hbomberguy revealed that London's Reactor essay about Stephen King's IT was among the pieces plagiarized in James Somerton's videos on LGBTQ representation in pop culture.

In 2023, there was an attempt to ban his middle grade fantasy Battle Dragons series in Kentucky because of the inclusion of a non-binary character, but the ban was reversed.

== Bibliography ==
=== Adult nonfiction ===
- One Day The Soldiers Came: Voices of Children in War (2007) HarperPerennial
- Far From Zion: In Search of a Global Jewish Community (2009) William Morrow

=== Young adult fiction ===
- Proxy; Philomel/Penguin Young Readers Group
  - Proxy (2013);
  - Guardian (2014)
- Skybound Saga Farrar, Straus, & Giroux-Macmillan Children's
  - Black Wings Beating (2018)
  - Red Skies Falling (2019)
  - Gold Wings Rising (2020)

=== Middle grade fiction ===
- The Accidental Adventures, Philomel/Penguin Young Readers
  - Book 1: We Are Not Eaten By Yaks (2011)
  - Book 2: We Dine with Cannibals (2012)
  - Book 3: We Give a Squid a Wedgie (2013)
  - Book 4: We Sled With Dragons (2013)
- Dog Tags Scholastic Books
  - Semper Fido (2012)
  - Strays (2012)
  - Prisoners of War (2013)
  - Divided We Fall (2013)
- Tides of War Scholastic Books
  - Blood in the Water (2014)
  - Honor Bound (2014)
  - Enemy Lines (2015)
  - Endurance (2015)
- The 39 Clues Scholastic Books
  - Mission Hindenburg (2015)
  - Outbreak: Superspecial (2016)
- The Wild Ones/Philomel Penguin Young Readers Group
  - The Wild Ones (2015)
  - Moonlight Brigade (2016)
  - Great Escape (2017)
- Battle Dragons Scholastic Books
  - City of Thieves (2021)
  - City of Speed (2022)
  - City of Secrets (2023)
- Search and Rescue:
  - Pentagon Escape (2023); Scholastic Books
- The Princess Protection Program Greenwillow Books/HarperCollins
  - The Princess Protection Program (2023)
  - After Ever After (2024)

=== Picture books ===
- Still Life, illus. Paul O Zelinsky (2024); Greenwillow/HarperCollins Publishers
- The Adventures of Wrong Man and Power Girl, illus. Frank Morrison (2018); Philomel-Penguin Young Readers Group
- New Day, New Friends, illus. Ying-Hwa Hu (2011); LitWorld

=== Short fiction in anthologies ===
- "Lucky Dog", Twelve Tales of Rescued Dogs (Scholastic, 2014)
- "Been There, Done That", School Dazed, ed. Mike Winchell (Grosset & Dunlap, 2016)
- Hope Nation, ed. Rose Brock (Philomel, 2018)
- It’s A Whole Spiel, ed. Katherine Locke & Laura Silverman (Knopf BYR, 2019)
- Out There: Into the Queer New Yonder, ed. Saundra Mitchell (Inkyard Press, 2022)
- At Midnight, ed. Dahlia Adler (Flatiron Books 2022)
- Don’t Touch That: A Parenting in SFF Anthology, ed. Jaymee Goh (2022)
- Unscrolled; Workman Books, ed. Roger Bennet (2013)
