= Geography Club (film) =

2013 film by Gary Entin

- Theatrical release poster
- Directed by: Gary Entin
- Screenplay by: Edmund Entin
- Based on: Geography Club by Brent Hartinger
- Produced by: Michael Huffington; Anthony Bretti
- Starring: Cameron Deane Stewart; Justin Deeley; Meaghan Martin; Allie Gonino; Nikki Blonsky; Andrew Caldwell; Marin Hinkle; Ana Gasteyer; Scott Bakula
- Cinematography: Matthew Irving
- Edited by: William Yeh
- Music by: Lior Rosner
- Production companies: Shoreline Entertainment; Huffington Pictures; The Levy Leder Company
- Distributed by: Breaking Glass Pictures
- Release dates: April 27, 2013 (Newport Beach Film Festival); November 15, 2013 (United States)
- Running time: 83 minutes
- Country: United States
- Language: English
- Box office: $477,463

Geography Club is a 2013 American comedy drama film directed by Gary Entin from a screenplay by Edmund Entin, based on the 2003 novel of the same name by Brent Hartinger. The film stars Cameron Deane Stewart, Justin Deeley, Meaghan Martin, Allie Gonino, Nikki Blonsky, Andrew Caldwell, Marin Hinkle, Ana Gasteyer, and Scott Bakula.

It premiered on ABC Family as a world premiere movie.

== Plot ==
Russell is 16 years-old and is going on dates with girls. But he's recently started falling for football quarterback Kevin. When Min stumbles across Russell and Kevin kissing for the first time during a school trip, she decides to invite Russell to an LGBT support group in the school. This group meets in a classroom regularly and masquerades as a Geography Club. The club consists of a small number of students including Min and Therese who tell everyone that they are just really good friends when in reality this is not the case. There is also Ike who can't quite figure out who he really is.

Russell gets invited to a meal at Kevin's parents house after a great football match. The meal is awkward due to the father's questioning and the guys' feelings for each other. Meanwhile, Russell's best friend Gunnar gets Kevin to go on a trip with some girls. He's upset that they aren't as close as they were and knows he's acting weird. While they are hanging out, the girls try to come on to Russell. He leaves and walks home by himself messaging Kevin asking for a lift home, confiding in his worries.

As the weeks go by the Geography Club members grow closer supporting one another. The group chastises Russell when he bullies one of the other club members due to peer pressure from classmates. Rumors have spread that Russell is a “homo” and he's been kicked off the football team. Min suggests that the club finally go public which means they will all be outed. Kevin meets Russell to apologize for him being kicked off the team. Russell tells Kevin he should join the Geography Club but Kevin freaks out saying he can't. He wants to stay in the closet, play football and be ‘normal’. Russell gives Kevin an ultimatum. Either turn up tomorrow at the club or they should go their separate ways.

Gunnar and Russell make amends and the club goes public welcoming new people. Kevin watches on from a distance not feeling able to attend. Russell stands up and welcomes students to the first ever Gay Straight Alliance (GSA) meeting.

== Cast ==
- Cameron Deane Stewart as Russell Middlebrook
- Justin Deeley as Kevin Land
- Andrew Caldwell as Gunnar
- Meaghan Martin as Trish
- Allie Gonino as Kimberly
- Ally Maki as Min
- Nikki Blonsky as Therese
- Alex Newell as Ike
- Teo Olivares as Brian Bund
- Dexter Darden as Jared Sharp
- Grant Harvey as Nolan Lockwood
- Marin Hinkle as Barbara Land
- Ana Gasteyer as Mrs. Toles
- Scott Bakula as Carl Land
- Wesley Eure as Mr. Kaplan
- Mike Muscat as a Deranged Homeless Man

== Release ==
Geography Club premiered at the Newport Beach Film Festival on April 27, 2013. The film received a limited theatrical release by Breaking Glass Pictures on November 15, 2013, and was also released digitally the same day on iTunes, Amazon Video and VOD.

== Reception ==
Geography Club received mixed to positive reviews from critics, who praised its earnest approach to the struggles of closeted teenagers and its message of self-acceptance. While some reviewers noted that the film relies on familiar high school tropes, it was largely commended for providing a relatable and much-needed affirming narrative for LGBTQ+ youth.

On Rotten Tomatoes the film holds a 67% rating based on 12 reviews, with an average rating of 6/10. On Metacritic, the film has a weighted average score of 57 based on reviews from 5 critics, indicating "mixed or average" reviews.

Writing for The Huffington Post, John Lopez describes the film as entertaining and praises the themes as "universal and relatable", as well as for trying to define a "new normal" where homosexuality is accepted as an everyday thing.

Entertainment Tonight hails Geography Club saying, "Every year sees the release of one film so culturally important it should be required viewing. This year, that film is Geography Club." The Movie and Television Review and Classification Board (MTRCB) of the Philippine government gave the movie a PG rating and highly commends the film as a "sweet and sensitive coming out, coming of age movie based on the first novel of the young adult series/play of the same name."

== Awards ==
Following is a list of awards that Geography Club or its cast have won or for which they have been nominated.

Won

- L.A. Outfest
  - Audience Award – Best Feature Film

Nominated

- L.A. Outfest
  - Best Performance by an Actress in a Leading Role – Meaghan Martin
- GLAAD Award Outstanding Film – Limited Release nominated

== Home media ==
Breaking Glass Pictures released Geography Club on DVD on March 25, 2014.
