= Dream Boy =

1995 novel by Jim Grimsley

- Author: Jim Grimsley
- Language: English
- Genre: Novel
- Publisher: Algonquin Books of Chapel Hill
- Publication date: 1995 (1st edition)
- Publication place: United States
- Media type: Hardback
- Pages: 195 p. (hardback 1st edition)
- ISBN: 1-56512-106-6 (hardback 1st edition)
- OCLC: 32389146
- Dewey Decimal: 813/.54 20
- LC Class: PS3557.R4949 D74 1995

Dream Boy is a 1995 novel by Jim Grimsley.

== Plot summary ==
Nathan is an intelligent but shy teenage boy who wants to escape from his abusive and violent father, and fantasizes about a relationship with Roy, the boy who lives next door. Roy is a senior at the same high school as Nathan, and he drives the school bus. Gradually their relationship deepens and becomes sexual.

Drunk one evening, Nathan's father tries to molest him. This is clearly not the first time it has happened and helps explain Nathan's desire to escape from his family. His mother avoids the issue, although she knows what is going on.

Nathan is accepted into Roy's social circle and is invited to go on a camping trip with Roy and his friends Randy and Burke. During the trip, they discover an abandoned and possibly haunted plantation house and Nathan and Roy are discovered in a compromising situation. Burke later on rapes and hits Nathan with a chair handle. The blow is clearly fatal and Nathan "dies" yet is still inside his body and aware of his surroundings. The book ends with Nathan leaving the abandoned house and finding Roy.

== Film adaptation ==
Dream Boy has been adapted for a film, written and directed by James Bolton. It stars Stephan Bender as Nathan and Maximillian Roeg as Roy, and features musician Rickie Lee Jones as Roy's mother. The film was first screened on February 12, 2008 at the Berlin International Film Festival. Richard Buckner recorded the film's soundtrack.

== See also ==
- Gay male teen fiction
