= Proxy (novel) =

2013 sci-fi, dystopian young adult novel by Alex London

- Author: Alex London
- Language: English
- Genre: Young adult, Dystopia
- Publisher: Philomel Books
- Publication date: June 18, 2013
- Publication place: United States
- Media type: Print (Hardcover)
- Pages: 384 pp.
- ISBN: 0399257764
- Followed by: Guardian

Proxy is a sci-fi dystopian young adult novel by Alex London, released on June 18, 2013. A sequel to the novel was released in 2014, called Guardian. The novel utilizes a third-person, subjective narration style that alternates between characters Knox Brindle and Sydney Carton.

London drew inspiration for Proxy from the 1987 book The Whipping Boy, "where the rich pay for the poor to take their punishments." He states that the novel includes commentary on society regarding debt, corporations, capitalism, technological progress, social class, and human morality.

== Plot ==
=== Setting ===
The book is set in a distant post-cataclysmic future where civilization has evolved its technology rapidly through unrestricted capitalism to bring about a world where nearly every conceivable service can be purchased. Society has developed into a rigid class system where the Upper City lives in luxury while the Lower City lives in poverty and its people rapidly accrue debt to pay for necessary health and technological services. As a result of the Lower City being infinitely indebted to Upper City's corporations, the middle class has been eliminated altogether.

Upper City citizens can purchase the debts of people from the Lower City. The wealthy patron will pay for the poorer person's essential needs and in return they serve as proxies to be punished in place of the patron when the patron breaks the law, or supply blood or organs for the patron's health needs. Many Lower City citizens assume this debt at birth and have no way to repay, challenge, or escape it. Contact between proxies and patrons is outlawed. This system has brought about the existence of the Rebooters, a rebel organization set on destroying it by inducing "Jubilee", an event that would erase all digital data and records, including currency and debts.

=== Synopsis ===
Sydney "Syd" Carton is a 16-year-old boy who has been labeled as "Chapter 11" due to being gay. Since infancy, he has served as proxy for the rebellious Knox, whose behavior has resulted in frequent punishment throughout Syd's life. When Knox's actions result in the death of Marie Alvarez, an Upper City citizen, Syd is charged with vehicular manslaughter and is sentenced to a work prison. Knox also receives a blood transfusion from Sydney due to his injuries; unwittingly transmitting a mysterious virus. Through his education with Baram, Syd manages to flee the prison and escapes to the Lower City and as his best friend, Egan, to help him purchase a new identity through an Upper City contact. When this contact is revealed to be Knox, Syd decides to kidnap Knox as leverage for escape.

At Knox's house, the two overhear shocking news from his father. Marie is still alive; her death was set up to give Knox a wake-up call. They also want Syd dead after discovering his blood contains a virus that is capable of threatening the entire digital infrastructure of the Upper City. The pair are almost caught by the Guardians but are rescued at the last moment by Marie, who is unhappy with and wants to end the proxy system. The trio discover that Knox's father wants to neutralize Baram because of his affiliation with the Rebooters. They manage to warn Baram, who tells Syd that his virus, created by his father, can bring about Jubilee.

Marie's proxy, Beatrice, is threatened, but Marie allows her to be killed to rescue Syd. Syd, Knox, and Marie escape the city with the help of Egan, who has made a deal with Rebooter mercenaries to bring Syd to their camp in Old Detroit. On the way they discover that the mercenary group was actually hired by Knox's father to kill Syd; Egan is killed by their leader. Syd only survives with Marie's help and kills the mercenary leader. As Knox struggles with guilt about his father's wrongs and his treatment of Syd, the group resumes their quest for the Rebooters.

The trio successfully reaches Old Detroit, where they reunite with Baram, who reveals that the only way to enact Jubilee is to remove the virus from Syd, and that doing so will kill him. Distraught, Syd and Knox try to flee the city but are met with a large force of Guardians storming Old Detroit. Faced with this, Syd decides that he is willing to sacrifice himself and returns to upload the virus. However, Knox, realizing that Syd's blood transfusion transmitted the virus to his body as well, sacrifices himself in Syd's place, considering payback for the life Syd gave him. Knox tells Syd he can choose his own future before enacting debt Jubilee onto the world.

== Characters ==
=== Main characters ===
- Sydney Allex Carton - A dark-skinned gay 16-year-old who lives in the Valve in the Lower City. He is proxy to Knox and carries a virus capable of erasing all digital records and data. This makes him a target of the Upper City super corporations. The novel's protagonist. His name was chosen by London from A Tale of Two Cities.
- Marie Alvarez - A 16-year-old Upper City "cause-girl" who fakes her death to teach Knox a lesson. Patron to Beatrice. She accompanies Sydney on his journey to the Rebooters because of her political ideology.
- Knox Brindle - A 16-year-old Upper City troublemaker with a poor relationship with his father, who is the CEO of a super corporation. He accompanies Sydney on his journey to the Rebooters to rebel against his father and to ease his guilty conscience for the pain he has caused Sydney as his patron.

=== Other characters ===
- Eeron Brindle - Knox's father and the primary antagonist of the novel. The powerful CEO of a super corporation who ruthlessly preserves the interests of the Upper City by hunting down Sydney.
- Mr. Baram - The caretaker to Sydney and a significant rebel figure for the Rebooters.
- Gordis - A wilderness scavenger associated with the Rebooters who delivers the main characters to Old Detroit. He sacrifices himself to buy Syd and Knox time to enact Jubilee.
- Xiao Alvarez - Marie's father. An important Upper City client to Knox's father and ally to the antagonist group.
- Egan - One of Sydney's only friends from the Lower City. A drug addict who joins up with Mae's gang in order to better look after Sydney. He is murdered in the wilderness by the gang's leader.
- Beatrice - Marie's proxy. She is executed by the Guardians because Marie refuses to turn herself over.
- Atticus Finch - Sydney's high school crush. The name was taken from a character in To Kill a Mockingbird.
- Nurse Bovary - Knox's nurse.
- Simi, Cheyenne, and Nine - Knox's Upper City friends that also get into trouble. Cheyenne is the one that gives Knox the drug patch.

== Reception ==
Critical reception for Proxy was positive and the book received praise from the Deseret News and Lambda Literary. Kirkus Reviews called it "a smart, stylish science-fiction thriller that deftly weaves big issues like guilt, accidents of birth, redemption and commerce into a page-turning read." The Bulletin of the Center for Children's Books also gave a favorable review, praising the book for its "poignant story of friendship and self-sacrifice" and for featuring a "gay action hero whose sexuality is only one facet of his character." The novel has been featured on state reading lists for middle and high school students, including the 2015 Colorado Blue Spruce List, the 2015 Texas Lonestar (middle school) Reading List, the 2015 Texas TAYSHAS (high school) Reading List, the 2016 Missouri Gateway Award, and the 2016 Oklahoma Sequoyah Intermediate Reading List. It t was selected by the American Library Association as a Top 10 Quick Pick for Reluctant Young Readers, a Best Fiction For Young Adults selection, a Rainbow List selection, and a 2016 ALA Popular Paperback for Young Adults.

Proxy appeared as one of 850 books on Texas politician Matt Krause's 2021 list of books he demand libraries review for content, because of its inclusion of LGBTQ characters.
