= Robert Joseph Greene =

Canadian author of gay romance fiction (born 1973)

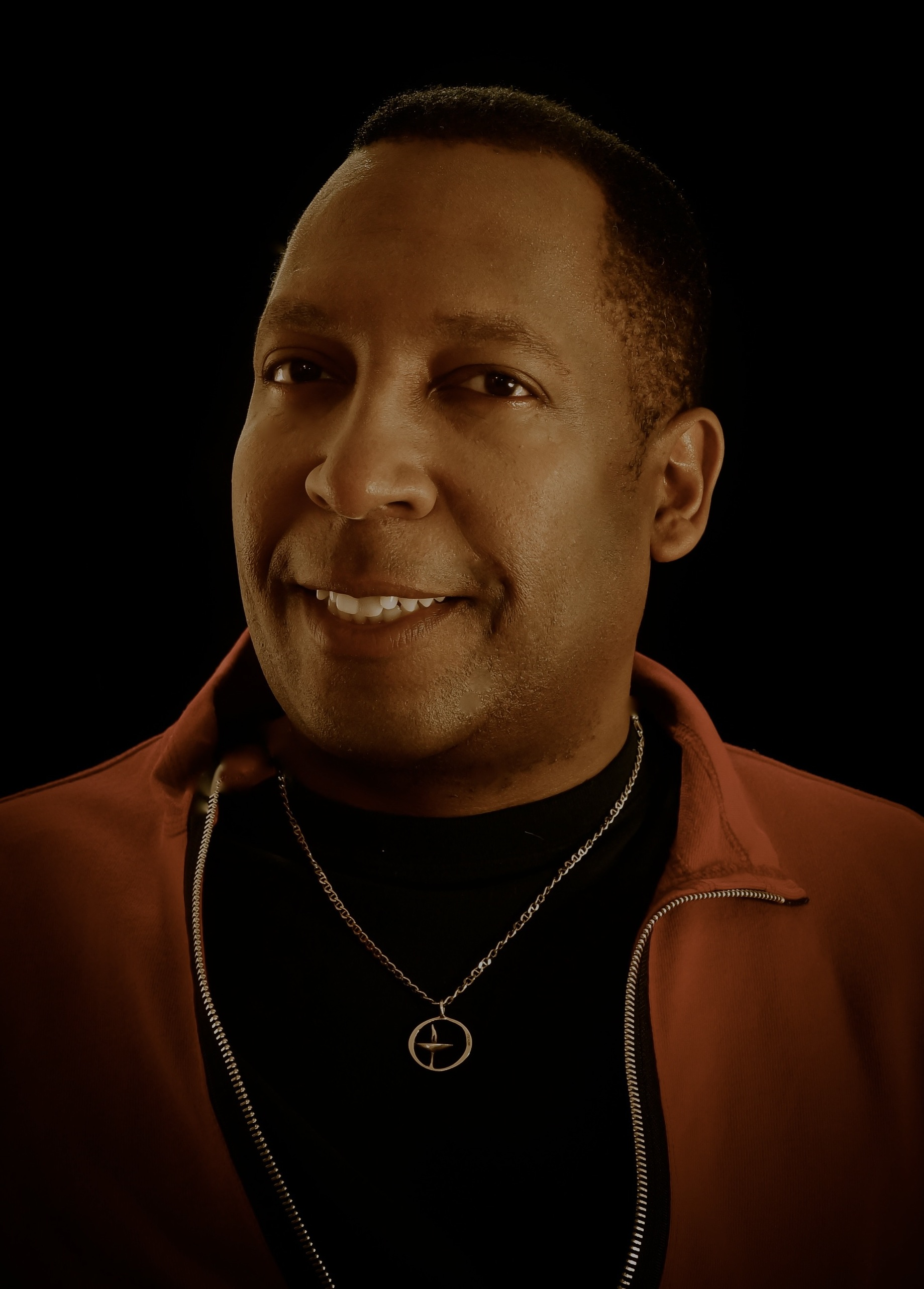
- Greene in 2011
- Born: January 11, 1973 (age 53); Canada
- Occupations: Writer, anthologist
- Writing career
- Period: 2000s-present
- Notable works: The Gay Icon Classics of the World, This High School Has Closets

Robert Joseph Greene (born January 11, 1973) is a Canadian author of gay romance fiction, best known for The Gay Icon Classics of the World, a collection of gay-themed love stories from over 12 different countries. Each story represents a culture and a people. The book was listed by PFLAG Canada as a recommended book in their "Books Worth Reading" section.

One of the short stories in the Gay Icon Classics collection is "Halo's Golden Circle", a tragic love story set in ancient Judea. Author and Jewish scholar Steven Greenberg remarked that it was a "beautiful story".

Greene is cousin to American Jazz vocalist Carmen McRae.

== Writing career ==
Letters From Camp Rehoboth published an excerpt from "The Journey and the Jewels" in 2006. The Watermark, a weekly LGBT publication in Florida, gave kudos in their story which honored the writer.

Following the release of The Gay Icon Classics of the World II in 2012, a group of Russian students translated "The Blue Door", a story from the collection about a young Russian prince who comes out as gay, and used it as a protest against the "homosexual propaganda" laws enacted in Saint Petersburg. In 2013, Greene publicly stated that he had received death threats from readers in Russia over the story.

In June 2013, publishing group Weltbild, which was owned 100% by the Catholic Diocese of Germany, removed Greene's books from their stores. The reason given by Weltbild was that Greene's books did not conform to the company's "traditional values". The decision was criticized because the publisher at the same time kept more erotic heterosexual books in its inventory.

Greene's This High School Has Closets was a longlisted nominee for the Lambda Literary Awards in the 2012 young adult novels category.

In January 2014, Greene embarked on a lobbying campaign among ornithologists to get Merriam-Websters Dictionary to have a "Jabber of Jays" as an official term under bird groups.

In April 2015, Greene was a finalist for the 2015 Vancouver Pride Legacy Turquoise Award for the Arts.

== Canadian Broadcast Standards Council ==
In February 2008, Greene filed a complaint with the Canadian Broadcast Standards Council (CBSC) against CKYE-FM and the Harjinder Thind Radio Show that aired on January 31, 2008. The complaint cited bias against the LGBT community. Greene also stated that the radio show allowed callers to make inaccurate statements against the LGBT Community and did not allow or invite any discussion for an opposing view. After a formal investigation, on October 23, 2008, the CBSC issued their decision and sided with Greene and found CKYE-FM and the Harjinder Thind Show in violation of the Canadian Human Rights Act and the Canadian Association of Broadcasters Code of Ethics, Clause 7. CKYE-FM and the Harjinder Thind Show were required to air the decision and correction both in Punjabi and English.

== Canadian Library Association ==
In 2012, Greene's publisher found that librarians would not review This High School Has Closets because they might provoke negative reactions from the public. This prompted the Canadian Library Association to reiterate their policy towards LGBT inclusiveness that would apply to "freedom of expression".

== Works ==
- The Gay Icon Classics of the World
- The Gay Icon Contemporary Short Stories
- This High School has Closets
- Crossover: Straight Men – Gay Encounters
- The Gay Icon Classics of the World II
- Would You Mind?
- The Forbidden Scroll
- The Counting of Sins
