= Andrew Caldwell (actor) =

American actor

- Born: Andrew Lewis Caldwell; Grand Blanc, Michigan, U.S.
- Other name: Andrew L. Caldwell
- Occupation: Actor
- Years active: 2005–present

Andrew Lewis Caldwell is an American actor. He is known for his starring roles in the 2008 film College and the 2013 film Geography Club, and for his appearances in television series such as Henry Danger and iZombie.

== Career ==
Caldwell appeared on Hannah Montana in its second season in the recurring role of Thor, a new kid from Minnesota that Jackson befriends, in 2007. He played the bully, Bubba Bixby, in the 2007 Nickelodeon movie, Shredderman Rules. He provided the voice of Howard Weinerman on the 2012–2015 Disney XD animated series Randy Cunningham: 9th Grade Ninja.

Caldwell has had small roles in several films, including Transformers and Drillbit Taylor starring Owen Wilson. He had a starring role in the 2008 comedy film College alongside Drake Bell. Caldwell co-starred in the 2013 independent teen comedy Geography Club.

In late 2016 Caldwell was cast in a recurring role on the third season of the CW television series iZombie, playing the role of Harley Jones an anti-government extremist.

In 2021, Caldwell provided the voice of Frank Spicer in the Arkane Lyon and Bethesda game, Deathloop.

In November 2024, he was cast in a recurring role on the superhero series Spider-Noir.

== Filmography ==
=== Film ===
Year	Title	Role	Notes
2006	Fleetwood	Fleetwood	
2006	Tenacious D in The Pick of Destiny	Billy Black	
2007	Transformers	Café Kid	
2007	7-10 Split	High School Kid #1	
2008	Drillbit Taylor	Filkins' Buddy	
2008	College	Carter Scott	
2008	My Best Friend's Girl	Sad Dork	
2009	Endless Bummer	Kenny	
2009	All About Steve	Young Rescuer	
2010	I Owe My Life to Corbin Bleu	Andy	Short film; producer and writer
2012	Scary or Die	Bill Blotto	
2013	Geography Club	Gunnar	
2013	National Lampoon Presents: Surf Party	Kenny	
2013	Stripped	N/A	Short film; writer
2014	Confessions of a Womanizer	Matt	
2015	Angel Investors	Fred	
2015	Tim Timmerman, Hope of America	Garrett Strubbs	
2016	The Sons of Summer	Nick Kosko	
2017	M.F.A.	Ryder	
2019	Haunt	Evan	
2021	The Matrix Resurrections	Jude	credited as Andrew Lewis Caldwell
TBA	Spring Break '83	Mouth	completed; release postponed since 2007

=== Television ===
Year	Title	Role	Notes
2005	The Bernie Mac Show	Wrestler	Episode: "Wrestling with a Sticky Situation"
2006	Medium	Student	Episode: "Raising Cain"
2006	The Chronicles of the Dark Carnival	Bubba	Television film
2007	My Name Is Earl	Jake	Episode: "G.E.D."
2007	Hannah Montana	Thor	3 episodes
2007	Punk'd	Field Agent	Episode #8.8
2007	Shredderman Rules	Alvin 'Bubba' Bixby	Television film
2007	Avatar: The Last Airbender	Teen Roku	Voice role; episode: "The Avatar and the Fire Lord"
2008	Sunday! Sunday! Sunday!	Blaine Riley	Television film
2009	The Fish Tank	Gabe	Television film
2009	American Dad!	N/A	Voice role; episode: "Bar Mitzvah Hustle"
2009	Brothers	Vernon Goldsmith	Episode: "Snoop/Fat Kid"
2009	Accidentally on Purpose	Franklin	Episodes: Pilot, "The Date"
2010	How I Met Your Mother	Scotty	Episodes: "Jenkins", "Canning Randy"
2010	Detroit 1-8-7	Adam Stoltz	Episode: "Déjà Vu/All In"
2011, 2014	Good Luck Charlie	Billy "Gravy" Graves	Episodes: "Bye Bye Video Diary", "Termite Queen", "Good Bye Charlie"
2012	Victorious	Merl	Episode: "The Hambone King"
2012–2015	Randy Cunningham: 9th Grade Ninja	Howard Weinerman	Main voice role
2014	Cloud 9	Sam	Disney Channel Original Movie
2015	Filthy Preppy Teens	Chris Malloy	Episode: "The Return of the Prodigal Teens"
2015–2016, 2019–2020	Henry Danger	Mitch Bilsky	Recurring role, 11 episodes
2016	Bunk'd	Ted	Episode: "No Escape"
2016	Mary + Jane	Doug	Episode: "Rehab"
2017	iZombie	Harley Johns	Recurring role (season 3)
2017	American Vandal	Cooper Maxwell	Episode: "Nailed"
2017	Ryan Hansen Solves Crimes on Television	David	Episode: Pilot
2018	The Librarians	Jeff Peppers	Episode: "And Some Dude Named Jeff"
2018	The Adventures of Kid Danger	Mitch Bilsky	Voice role, 4 episodes
2019	Mom	Stink	Episode: "Fake Bacon and a Plan to Kill All of Us"
2021–2022	Danger Force	Mitch Bilsky	4 episodes
2022	Cursed Friends	Josh	Television film; as Andrew Lewis Caldwell
2026	Spider-Noir	Dirk Leydon / Megawatt	Recurring role, 5 episodes
