= Marin Hinkle =

American actress (born 1966)

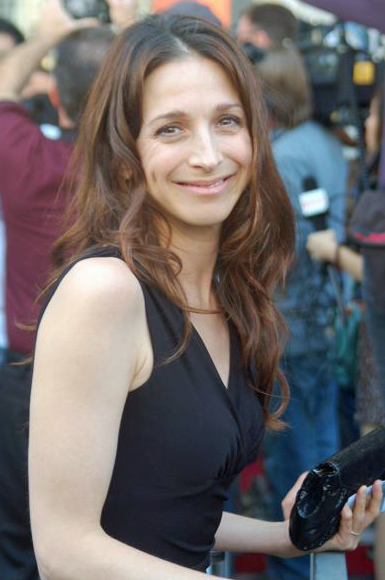
- Hinkle at the Hollywood Walk of Fame in September 2011
- Born: March 23, 1966 (age 60); Dar es Salaam, Tanzania
- Education: Brown University (BA); New York University (MFA)
- Occupation: Actress
- Years active: 1994–present
- Spouse: Randall Sommer (m. 1997; div. 2024)
- Children: 1

Marin Hinkle (born March 23, 1966) is an American actress. Among many television and movie roles, she is best known for playing Judy Brooks in the ABC television drama Once and Again (1999–2002), Judith Harper-Melnick in the CBS sitcom Two and a Half Men (2003–2015), and Rose Weissman in the Amazon Prime Video comedy-drama series The Marvelous Mrs. Maisel (2017–2023). For her role in The Marvelous Mrs. Maisel, Hinkle was nominated for the Primetime Emmy Award for Outstanding Supporting Actress in a Comedy Series in 2019 and 2020.

== Early life ==
Hinkle was born in Dar es Salaam, Tanzania, to American parents. She is the daughter of Margaret R. (Polga) Hinkle, a judge of the Superior Court of Massachusetts, and Rodney Hinkle, a college dean and teacher, who met while serving in the Peace Corps. Her family moved to Boston, Massachusetts, when she was four months old. Two years later, her brother Mark was born. Hinkle has Italian ancestry. After graduating from Newton South High School, she attended Brown University and New York University's Graduate Acting Program at the Tisch School of the Arts, graduating in 1991.

== Career ==
Hinkle played Juliet in Romeo and Juliet, opposite Jean Stapleton playing the Nurse, at the Shakespeare Theatre Company from January 25 to March 13, 1994, at the Lansburgh Theatre in Washington, D.C. On Broadway, she played Kuroko and was the understudy for Miranda in The Tempest from November 1 to December 31, 1995, at the Broadhurst Theatre. She played Sandra Markowitz in A Thousand Clowns from July 14 to August 10, 1996, at the Criterion Center Stage Right. She also played Chrysothemis in Electra from December 3, 1998, to March 21, 1999, at the Ethel Barrymore Theatre.

Hinkle started her TV career on the soap opera Another World. She also portrayed Judy Brooks on ABC's drama series Once and Again from 1999 to 2002. Hinkle starred on the CBS sitcom Two and a Half Men with Charlie Sheen, Jon Cryer, Angus T. Jones, and later Ashton Kutcher as Alan's neurotic ex-wife, Judith. Despite being a main cast member, she rarely made appearances after the show's eighth season. She was quietly phased out of the series, and her last appearances as a regular were in the ninth season of the series. She made only one appearance each in the last three seasons, though she was still credited as a regular. This may have been due to commitments to her new role as Samantha Bowers in the NBC drama series Deception with Tate Donovan, Victor Garber and Katherine LaNasa.

Hinkle has had roles in films such as I'm Not Rappaport, Frequency, The Next Big Thing, I Am Sam, and Dark Blue. She has also performed on stage in 2005 as the titular character in Miss Julie, opposite Reg Rogers. She appeared in the 2008 thrillers Quarantine and The Haunting of Molly Hartley, and has made guest appearances on shows such as Spin City, Law & Order: SVU, Without a Trace, ER, House, and three times as characters on Law & Order.

== Filmography ==
=== Film ===
Year	Title	Role	Notes
1994	Angie	Young Joanne	
1996	Milk & Money	Carla	
1996	Breathing Room	Larissa	
1996	I'm Not Rappaport	Hannah	
1998	Chocolate for Breakfast	Amy	
1998	Show & Tell	Pea	
2000	Killing Cinderella	Karen	
2000	Frequency	Sissy Clark	
2001	Sam the Man	Shelly	
2001	Final	Sherry	
2001	The Next Big Thing	Shari Lampkin	
2001	I Am Sam	Patricia	
2002	The Year That Trembled	Helen Kerrigan	
2002	Dark Blue	Assistant District Attorney Deena Schultz	
2005	Who's the Top?	Alixe	Short film
2006	Friends with Money	Maya	
2007	The Ex	Karen	
2007	Cough Drop	Rebecca Dewey	Short film
2007	Turn the River	Ellen	
2007	Rails & Ties	Renee	
2008	What Just Happened	Vanity Fair Coordinator	
2008	Quarantine	Kathy	
2008	The Haunting of Molly Hartley	Jane Hartley	
2008	John's Hand	Cynthia	Short film
2009	Imagine That	Ms. Davis	
2009	Weather Girl	Jane	
2012	My Eleventh		
2013	Butterflies of Bill Baker	Emma	
2013	Geography Club	Barbara Land	
2014	Cowgirls 'n Angels: Dakota's Summer	Clara	
2017	Jumanji: Welcome to the Jungle	Janice Gilpin, Spencer's Mom	
2019	Jumanji: The Next Level	Janice Gilpin, Spencer's Mom	
2024	Players	Karen Kirk	
2025	The Electric State	Ms. Sablinsky	
2026	Jumanji: Open World	Janice Gilpin, Spencer's Mom	Post-production

=== Television ===
Year	Title	Role	Notes
1995	Another World	Alison Van Rohan	Episode #1.7922
1997	Spin City	Carolyn	Episode: "Mayor Over Miami"
1998	Law & Order	Leslie Russo	Episode: "Grief"
1999–2002	Once and Again	Judy Brooks	58 episodes
2000	Law & Order	Debbie Mason	Episode: "Stiff"
2001	WW3	Judy Rosenberg	Television film
2002	Without a Trace	Assistant District Attorney Angela Buckman	Episode: "Snatch Back"
2003–2015	Two and a Half Men	Judith Harper-Melnick	83 episodes
2004	ER	Kathy	Episode: "Impulse Control"
2005	House	Naomi Randolph	Episode: "Babies & Bathwater"
2005	Law & Order: Special Victims Unit	Janice Whitlock	Episode: "Raw"
2005	Fielder's Choice	Holly	Television film
2006	The Book of Daniel	Nancy	Episode: "Revelations"
2006	In Justice	Jane McDermott	Episode: "Brothers and Sisters"
2007–2008	The Sarah Silverman Program	Rose Silverman	3 episodes
2007–2011	Brothers & Sisters	Courtney McCallister	3 episodes
2008	My Own Worst Enemy	Elizabeth Q	Episode: "Henry and the Terrible... Day"
2009	Private Practice	Beverly	Episode: "Wait and See"
2009	Law & Order	Attorney Novelle	Episode: "Reality Bites"
2010	Law & Order: Criminal Intent	Moira Boyle	Episode: "Broad Channel"
2010	Army Wives	Suzanne	Episode: "Mud, Sweat & Tears"
2012	Don't Trust the B— in Apartment 23	Karen	2 episodes
2013	Deception	Samantha Bowers	11 episodes
2013	Missing at 17	Callie	Television film
2014	The Affair	Therapist	Episode: "7"
2014–2015	Red Band Society	Caroline Chota	2 episodes
2014–2019	Madam Secretary	Isabelle Barnes	9 episodes
2016	Castle	Dr. Rebecca Ellins	Episode: "Dead Again"
2016–2019	Speechless	Dr. Miller	22 episodes
2017–2018	Homeland	Christine Lonas	3 episodes
2017–2023	The Marvelous Mrs. Maisel	Rose Weissman	43 episodes
2019	Grey's Anatomy	Ashley Cordova	Episode: "My Shot"
2023	The Company You Keep	Claire Fox	Episode: "All In"
2024	We Were the Lucky Ones	Madame Lowbeer	Miniseries
2025	St. Denis Medical	Linda	Episode: "You Gotta Have a Plan"
2025	Good American Family	Jackie Starbuck	2 episodes

== Stage credits ==
Year	Title	Role	Venue	Ref.
1992	A Woman Without a Name	Susi Balis	Off-Broadway, Signature Theatre Company	
1992	Ambrosio	Antonia	Off-Broadway, Signature Theatre Company	
1995	The Tempest	Kuroko	Broadway, Broadhurst Theatre	
1996	Sabina	Sabina	Off-Broadway, Primary Stages	
1996	A Thousand Clowns	Sandra Markowitz	Broadway, Roundabout Theatre Company	
1996	Wonderful Time	Betsy Flynn	Off-Broadway, WPA Theatre	
1997	The Changeling	Beatrice-Joanna	Off-Broadway, Theater at St. Clement's Church	
1997	Henry VIII	Anne Boleyn	Off-Broadway, Delacorte Theatre/The Public Theater	
1997	A Dybbuk, or Between Two Worlds	Leah	Off-Broadway, The Public Theater	
1988	Electra	Chrysothemis	Broadway, Ethel Barrymore Theatre	
2002	The Fourth Sister	Katia	Off-Broadway, Vineyard Theatre	
2005	Miss Julie	Miss Julie	Off-Broadway, Rattlestick Theatre	
2012	Rx	Performer	Off-Broadway, 59E59 Theaters	
2014	Dinner with Friends	Karen,	Off-Broadway, Roundabout Theatre Company	
2025	The Reservoir	Patricia	Los Angeles, Geffen Playhouse	

== Awards and nominations ==
Year	Award	Category	Nominated work	Result
2014	ShoWest Convention	Ensemble Award	Geography Club	Nominated
2019	Primetime Emmy Awards	Outstanding Supporting Actress in a Comedy Series	The Marvelous Mrs. Maisel	Nominated
2019	Screen Actors Guild Awards	Outstanding Performance by an Ensemble in a Comedy Series	The Marvelous Mrs. Maisel	Won
2020	Primetime Emmy Awards	Outstanding Supporting Actress in a Comedy Series	The Marvelous Mrs. Maisel	Nominated
2020	Screen Actors Guild Awards	Outstanding Performance by an Ensemble in a Comedy Series	The Marvelous Mrs. Maisel	Won
