= Alex Sanchez (author) =

Mexican American author (born 1957)

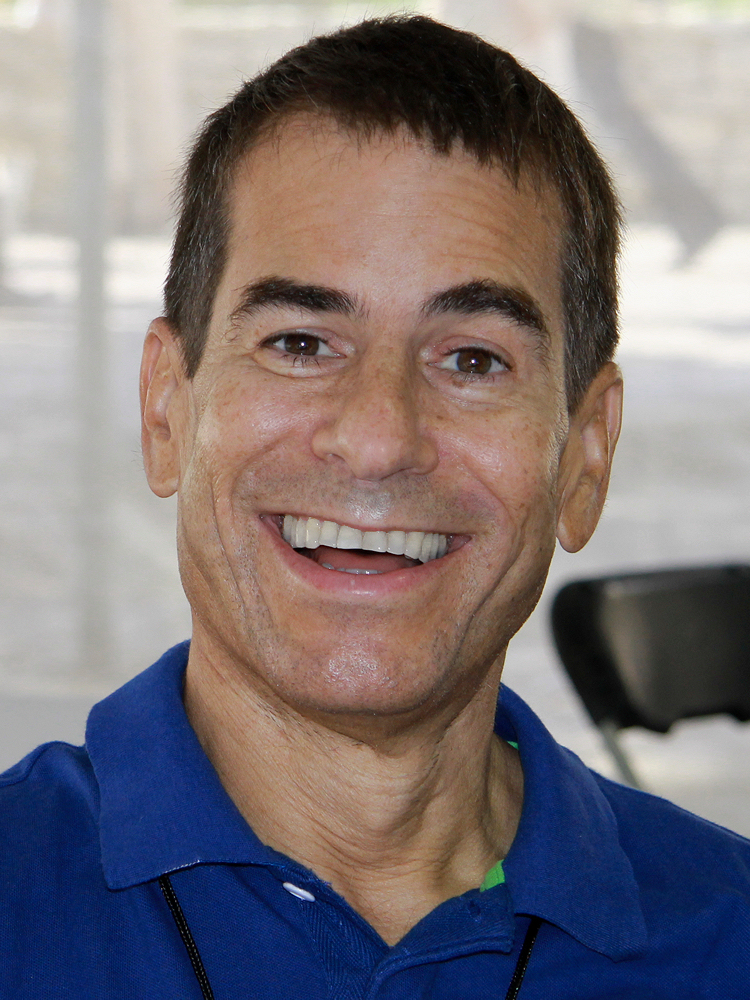
- Alex Sanchez at 2011 Texas Book Festival
- Born: 1957 (age 68–69); Mexico City, Mexico
- Occupation: Author
- Website: alexsanchez.com

Alex Sanchez (born 1957) is a Mexican American author of award-winning novels for teens and adults. His first novel, Rainbow Boys (2001), was selected by the American Library Association (ALA), as a Best Book for Young Adults. Subsequent books have won additional awards, including the Lambda Literary Award. Although Sanchez's novels are widely accepted in thousands of school and public libraries in America, they have faced a handful of challenges and efforts to ban them. In Webster, New York, removal of Rainbow Boys from the 2006 summer reading list was met by a counter-protest from students, parents, librarians, and community members resulting in the book being placed on the 2007 summer reading list.

== Life and career ==
Sanchez was born in 1957 in Mexico City, to parents of German and Cuban heritage; his family immigrated to the U.S. in 1962. He studied writing at the Fine Arts Work Center in Provincetown, Massachusetts, under Michael Cunningham, Richard McCann, Allan Gurganus, Peter Ho Davies, Michael Klein, Elizabeth McCracken, and Jacqueline Woodson.

Sanchez's works explore themes of love, friendship, coming of age, and LGBT questioning youth. His first novel, Rainbow Boys (2001), was selected by the American Library Association, as a Best Book for Young Adults. With the novel's debut, Publishers Weekly magazine deemed Sanchez a "Flying Start". Two sequels, Rainbow High (2003) and Rainbow Road (2005), complete the Rainbow trilogy, portraying the coming of age of three gay and bisexual teenage boys. Both novels were honored as "Books for the Teen Age" by the New York Public Library.

Sanchez's novel So Hard to Say (2004), about a group of 13-year-olds, won the Lambda Literary Award for Children's and Young Adult literature. Getting It (2006) won the Myers Outstanding Book Award for Human Rights and also second place at the 2007 Latino Book Awards for Best Young Adult Fiction in English. The God Box (2007), focuses on the conflict and friendship between two Christian teenage boys, one openly gay and the other struggling to accept his sexuality. Bait (2009), about a teenage boy struggling with secrets from his past, won the 2009 Florida Book Award Gold Medal for YA fiction and the 2011 Tomás Rivera Mexican-American Children's Book Award. Boyfriends with Girlfriends (2011) explores bisexuality in teens. In May 2011, the Lambda Literary Foundation awarded Sanchez the Outstanding Mid-Career Novelists' Prize. Additional works by Sanchez include his short story, If You Kiss a Boy, which appeared in the anthology 13: Thirteen Stories about the Agony and Ecstasy of Being Thirteen (2003), edited by James Howe.

Although Sanchez's novels are widely accepted in thousands of school and public libraries in the U.S. and Canada, they have faced a handful of challenges and efforts to ban them. Linda P. Harvey of Mission America in Columbus, Ohio, targeted Rainbow Boys in her 2002 essay "The World According to PFLAG: Why PFLAG and Children Don't Mix Unless you happen to like child abuse" [sic]. The book was also challenged by citizens in Owen, Wisconsin in 2005, but ultimately retained by the Owen-Withee Junior and Senior High School, although the superintendent suggested creating a policy of requiring guardian permission to check out the book (ABFFE). In addition to the Wisconsin challenge, the book was also challenged at the Montgomery County Memorial Library System in Montgomery County, Texas (Doyle 6). The ACLU of Texas also reports that Rainbow Boys was challenged in Texas during the 2004–05 school year (ACLUTX 30).

One of the most recent challenges occurred in 2006, when the Webster, New York Central School District removed Rainbow Boys from the summer reading list. After numerous protests from students, parents, librarians, and community members, the book was placed on the 2007 summer reading list. In Canada in 2008, the superintendent of schools for Charlotte County, New Brunswick canceled plans for Sanchez to speak to students in the high schools "after a few parents objected". However, after hearing Sanchez speak at a presentation, he said he would recommend the gay author as a speaker. "Oh absolutely. Definitely. Now that I've heard him, he's wonderful. But I needed to hear that message."

In June 2020, DC Comics published You Brought Me the Ocean, a graphic novel based on the character Aqualad, authored by Sanchez and illustrated by Jul Maroh, author of Blue is the Warmest Color.

Sanchez's novel The Greatest Superpower (2021) tells the story of twin thirteen-year-old boys whose beloved dad comes out as transgender. On August 11, 2021, Time magazine announced the selection of Rainbow Boys as one of "The 100 Best YA Books of All Time".

== Works, awards, and achievements ==
- Rainbow Boys (2001): American Library Association 2002 Best Book for Young Adults, International Reading Association 2003 "Young Adults' Choice", New York Public Library 2002 "Book for the Teen Age", Lambda Literary Award 2001 finalist, The Bulletin of the Center for Children's Books "Blue Ribbon Winner", Book-of-the-Month Club InsightOutBooks.com selection, Time magazine 100 Best YA Books of All Time
- Rainbow High (2003): Lambda Literary Award 2003 Finalist, New York Public Library 2004 "Book for the Teen Age", Children's Book Council Notable Social Studies Trade Book for Young People 2004, Book-of-the-Month Club InsightOutBooks.com Main Selection, Quality Paperback Book Club Featured Selection
- '"If You Kiss a Boy"' (short story in the anthology, 13: Thirteen Stories About the Agony and Ecstasy of Being Thirteen, James Howe, Ed., 2003). Selected by the Junior Library Guild.
- So Hard to Say (2004): Lambda Literary Award 2004 Winner; Rhode Island Teen Book Award Nominee; VOYA Top Shelf Fiction for Middle School Readers; Cooperative Children's Book Center (CCBC) Choice; Borders Bookstores "Original Voices: New and Emerging Writers" selection, Book-of-the-Month Club InsightOutBooks.com Featured Selection, Mi Zona Hispana selection, New York Public Library 2005 "Book for the Teen Age", Quill Award 2005 nominee
- Rainbow Road (2005): Lambda Literary Award 2005 Finalist; New York Public Library 2006 "Book for the Teen Age;" 2009 ALA "Popular Paperback for Young Adults;" Book-of-the-Month Club InsightOutBooks.com Featured Selection
- Getting It (2006): Myers Outstanding Book Award 2007 Winner; 9th International Latino Book Awards 2nd place Best Young Adult Fiction – English; New York Public Library 2007 "Book for the Teen Age;" Book-of-the-Month Club InsightOutBooks.com Featured Selection
- The God Box (2007): New York Public Library 2008 "Book for the Teen Age"; ALA 2014 Popular Paperbacks for Young Adults
- Bait (2009): Florida Book Award Gold Medal for Young Adult Fiction; 2011 Tomás Rivera Mexican-American Children's Book Award Winner
- Boyfriends with Girlfriends (2011): ALA "Quick Picks for Reluctant Readers;" ALA "Rainbow List"; Bankstreet College of Education Children's Book Committee 2012 Best Children's Books of the Year; Lambda Literary Award 2011 Finalist.
- '"The Secret Life of a Teenage Boy"' (short story in the anthology, All Out: The No Longer Secret Stories of Queer Teens Throughout the Ages, Saundra Mitchell, Ed., 2018).
- You Brought Me the Ocean (2020) graphic novel authored by Sanchez and illustrated by Jul Maroh: Finalist, 2020 Cybils Award (Children's and Young Adult Bloggers' Literary Awards); Nominee, 2021 (32nd) GLAAD Media Award for Outstanding Comic Book; Finalist, 2021 Ignyte Award for Best Comics Team.
- The Greatest Superpower (2021): Chicago Public Schools "Battle of the Books" 2021-2022 school year selection

In 2011 the Lambda Literary Foundation awarded Sanchez the Jim Duggins Outstanding Mid-Career Novelists' Prize. In 2016 he received an attribution in The American Heritage Dictionary of the English Language for the word majorly. In 2017 he served as a mentor for We Need Diverse Books and as a judge for the National Book Award in Young People's Literature.
