= Russel Middlebrook (series) =

Series of young adult books by Brent Hartinger

The Russel Middlebrook Series
- Geography Club; The Order of the Poison Oak; Double Feature; The Elephant of Surprise; Two Thousand Pounds Per Square Inch; Russel Middlebrook: The Futon Years
- Author: Brent Hartinger
- Country: United States
- Language: English
- Genre: Young adult fiction
- Media type: Print (hardback and paperback)

Russel Middlebrook is a series of young adult fiction novels written by Brent Hartinger. The series follows the lives and love lives of Russel Middlebrook and his friends as they create the Geography Club, a safe space for gay teenagers and eventually the first Gay-Straight-Bisexual Alliance at their school.

== The Order of the Poison Oak ==
“Summer camp is different from high school. Something about spending the night. Things happen.”

Geography Club's Russel Middlebrook is back, and he and his friends are off to work as counselors at a summer camp. Brent Hartinger's second novel is the story of Indian legends, skinny-dipping in moonlit coves, and passionate summer romance. It's also the story of Russel's latest club, the Order of the Poison Oak, a secret society dedicated to helping its members see life's hidden beauty and accept its sometimes painful sting.

== Double Feature ==
The third book in the series (originally released under the name Split Screen) follows Russel, Min, Gunnar, and Kevin as they play extras in a zombie movie that is filming in their town. The book is in two parts, the first part being from Russel's point of view and the second being from Min's.

In the first book, Attack of the Soul-Sucking Brain Zombies, Russel must choose between his long-distance boyfriend and a close-to-home ex named Kevin who wants to get back together. In the second book, Bride of the Soul-Sucking Brain Zombies, Min struggles to accept her cheerleader girlfriend's decision to stay in the closet.

== The Elephant of Surprise ==
People aren't always what they seem to be. Sometimes we even surprise ourselves. So discovers seventeen-year-old Russel Middlebrook in The Elephant of Surprise, a stand-alone sequel to Geography Club. In this book, Russel and his friends Min and Gunnar are laughing about something they call the Elephant of Surprise - the tendency for life to never turn out as expected. Sure enough, Russel soon happens upon a hot but mysterious homeless activist named Wade, even as he's drawn back to an old flame named Kevin.

Meanwhile, Min is learning surprising things about her girlfriend Leah, and Gunnar just wants to be left alone to pursue his latest technology obsession. But the elephant is definitely on the move in all three of their lives. Just who is Wade and what are he and his friends planning? What is Leah hiding? And why is Gunnar taking naked pictures of Kevin in the shower?

== "Two Thousand Pounds Per Square Inch" ==
But now Russel is facing his biggest challenge yet: getting tested for HIV, the virus that causes AIDS. Along the way, he learns a few things about safe sex and how to protect himself and others from the disease.

This free short story is part of The Real Story Safe Sex Project, an-all volunteer organization created by Brent Hartinger dedicated to using entertainment and popular culture to spread the word about HIV/AIDS and safe sex to gay and bi male teens and twentysomethings.

== Russel Middlebrook: The Futon Years ==
Russel's story continues in a second series, Russel Middlebrook: The Futon Years, a "new adult" series featuring the character in his early and mid-20s.

- The Thing I Didn't Know I Didn't Know
- Barefoot in the City of Broken Dreams
- The Road to Amazing

== Otto Digmore series ==
Follows the life of Russel's ex-boyfriend, actor Otto Digmore:

- The Otto Digmore Difference
- The Otto Digmore Decision
