= Jim Grimsley =

American writer (born 1955)

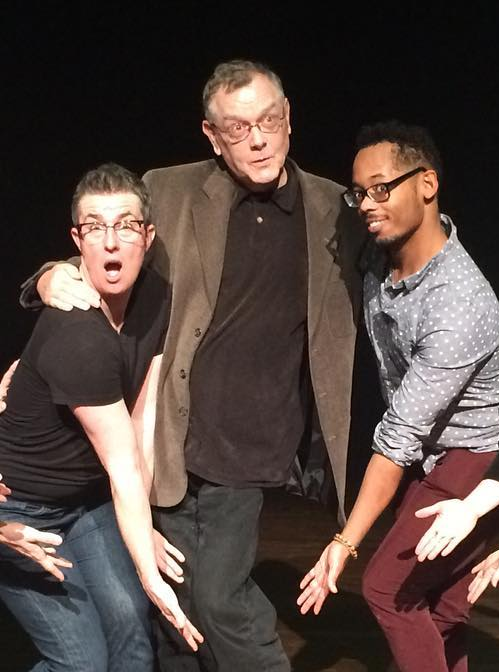
- Author Jim Grimsley at an HIV survivors event, 2016
- Born: September 21, 1955 (age 70); Grifton, North Carolina, U.S.
- Occupations: Novelist, playwright
- Website: jimgrimsley.net

Jim Grimsley (born September 21, 1955) is an American novelist and playwright.

== Biography ==
Born to a rural family in Grifton, North Carolina, Grimsley said of his childhood that "for us in the South, the family is a field where craziness grows like weeds".

After moving to Atlanta, he would spend nearly twenty years as a secretary at Atlanta's Grady Memorial Hospital before joining the creative-writing faculty at Emory University. During those years, Grimsley wrote prolifically, with fourteen of his plays produced between 1983 and 1993.

== Writing ==
His initial forays into novel writing were less successful than his dramatic work. The semiautobiographical Winter Birds was rejected as "too dark" by American publishers for ten years before appearing in a German edition; it only appeared in English sometime two years later. The novel then brought Grimsley much recognition: the Sue Kaufman Prize for First Fiction from the American Academy of Arts and Letters and a PEN/Hemingway Award citation.

It was followed by Dream Boy which received the American Library Association's Gay, Lesbian, and Bisexual Book Award for Literature (Stonewall Book Award) in 1996, and My Drowning, which won the Lila Wallace-Reader's Digest Writers' Award.

His 1999 book, Comfort & Joy, was a finalist for the 2000 Stonewall Book Award for Literature. He also wrote the high fantasy novel Kirith Kirin, which won the Lambda Literary Award, or 'Lammy', for best gay-themed science fiction or fantasy for the year 2000. This classically themed fantasy work was followed by two science fiction novels, The Ordinary and The Last Green Tree (2006 sequel to The Ordinary). His novel Forgiveness (ISBN 9780292716698) was published in 2007. Four of Grimsley's plays are collected in Mr. Universe and Other Plays.

He was awarded the Jim Duggins Outstanding Mid-Career Novelists' Prize by the Saints and Sinners Literary Festival in 2007.

In 2015, Grimlsey published a memoir entitled How I Shed My Skin: Unlearning the Racist Lessons of a Southern Childhood.

He has also worked on module for the Neverwinter Nights video game called Citadel that won a golden dragon award for best module and a Hall of Fame Award.

== Sources ==
- Grimsley, Jim, Out of Silence, Brightleaf: A Southern Review of Books, 3, March/April 1998
- Grimsley, Jim, Who We Are, Publishers Weekly, September 30, 1996, pp 46–47
- Howorth, Lisa. Jim Grimsley: Tales of Southern Courage, Publishers Weekly, November 5, 1999, pp. 39–40
