= John Donovan (writer) =

American writer (1928–1992)

- Born: 1928; Lynn, Massachusetts, U.S.
- Died: April 29, 1992 (aged 63–64); New York City, New York, U.S.
- Occupation: Writer
- Writing career
- Genres: Young adult literature, drama
- Notable work: I'll Get There. It Better Be Worth the Trip
- Website: johndonovanauthor.com

John Donovan (1928 – April 29, 1992) was an American writer of young adult literature. He is best known for his 1969 novel I'll Get There. It Better Be Worth the Trip, the first known young adult novel to directly address the subject of homosexuality.

== Early life ==
Born in Lynn, Massachusetts, Donovan was educated at the College of William and Mary and the University of Virginia. He worked for the copyright office of the Library of Congress before briefly joining St. Martin's Press.

== Career ==
Donovan published his first work as a writer, The Little Orange Book, in 1961.

In 1967, he became executive director of the Children's Book Council, a position he held until his death. In this position, he actively advocated for literature that addressed real life issues faced by children and teenagers.

I'll Get There. It Better Be Worth the Trip was named, in 2021, as one of Time magazine's "The 100 Best YA Books of All Time."

Donovan's later children's and young adult books included Wild in the World, Good Old James and Family. He also wrote two short plays, Damn You, Scarlett O'Hara and All My Pretty Ones, which were published in 1963 and staged off-Broadway in 1964 under the collective title Riverside Drive. The play's staging at New York City's Theatre de Lys starred Sylvia Sidney and Donald Woods.

== Personal life ==
Donovan's longtime partner was Stan Raiff, a theatre producer. The couple lived in Manhattan.

Donovan died on April 29, 1992, of cancer. His niece Stacey Donovan, also a published author known for the novel Dive, was the executor of his estate, and was involved in the 2010 republication of I'll Get There.

I'll Get There was the subject of an essay by Martin Wilson in the 2010 book The Lost Library: Gay Fiction Rediscovered.
