= The God Box (novel) =

2007 novel by Alex Sánchez

- First edition
- Author: Alex Sánchez
- Language: English
- Published: 2007 (Simon & Schuster Children's Publishing)
- ISBN: 1-4169-0899-4
- OCLC: 76897600
- LC Class: PZ7.S19475 God 2007

The God Box (2007), a novel by Alex Sánchez, focuses on the conflict and friendship between two Christian teenage boys, one openly gay and the other struggling to accept his sexuality. It was adapted into a play in 2009 which had its world premiere performance at Sacred Heart Preparatory in Atherton, CA.

== Plot ==
Paul is the perfect teenager: a beloved son, an attentive boyfriend, a good friend, he is perfect in anything he wants to achieve. When he is a teenager, Paul starts to have “strange” feelings for other guys, but feelings that he doesn't want to acknowledge. So he continues to live a seemingly perfect heterosexual life by dating his girlfriend Angie, and being very active in their local church community. When Paul is a senior in High School, a new student named Manuel transfers in. Manuel is the first openly gay teen anyone in their small town has ever met, and yet he says he's also a committed Christian. Paul's friendship with Manuel causes him to reconsider some of the things in his life. Such as re-interpreting the Bible's passages on homosexuality, and ending his romantic relationship with Angie. While at the movies one day, Paul freaks out after he and Manuel almost touch hands. Causing him to take off in his car. Paul is later shocked when he learns that Manuel was attacked up by two of their male classmates while walking home from the movie, and is now in a coma. He realizes during this hard time that he needs to accept himself, and comes out to his family and friends. When Manuel wakes up, he and Paul declare their love for each other and kiss. The story ends with Paul deciding to defer his first year of college in order to help with Manuel's physical therapy, and the two going to prom together with the school's newly-formed GSA.

== Reviews ==
The novel was reviewed by Publishers Weekly.
