= Bill Konigsberg =

American author (born 1970)

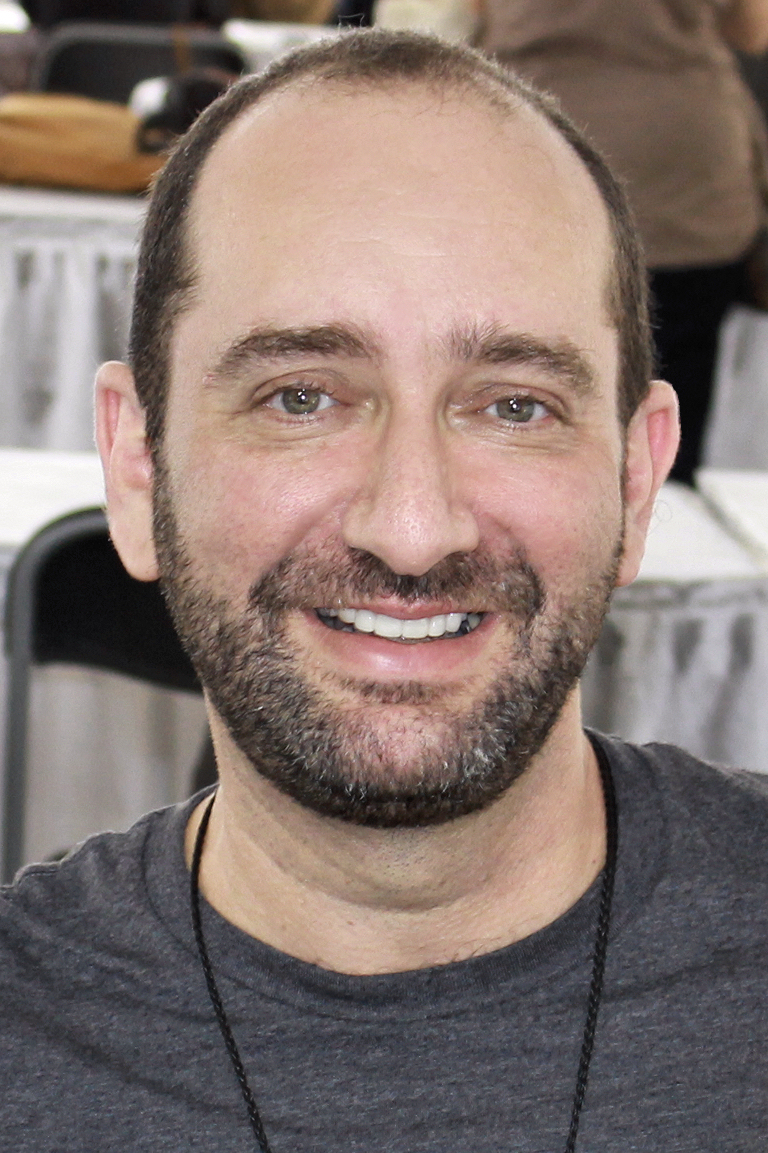
- Konigsberg at the 2015 Texas Book Festival
- Born: November 11, 1970 (age 55); New York City, U.S.
- Occupation: Author
- Writing career
- Language: English
- Period: 2008 – present
- Genres: Young adult, LGBT
- Notable works: Openly Straight; The Porcupine of Truth
- Website: billkonigsberg.com

Bill Konigsberg (born November 11, 1970) is an American author, best known for his LGBT novels. He wrote Out of the Pocket, Openly Straight, The Porcupine of Truth, Honestly Ben, The Music of What Happens, and The Bridge. He lives with his husband outside of Phoenix, Arizona.

== Work ==
=== Sports journalism ===
Before becoming a fiction writer, Konigsberg was a sports writer. As a sports writer and editor for the Associated Press from 2005 to 2008, he covered the New York Mets and his weekly fantasy baseball column appeared in newspapers across the country, from the New York Daily News to the Seattle Post-Intelligencer. In May 2001, while working for ESPN.com, he came out on the front page of the website in an article entitled "Sports World Still a Struggle for Gays". That article won him a GLAAD Media Award the following year.

Since then, he has spoken at numerous venues across the country on what it is like to be a gay person in the world of sports. Some of the publications he has written for include The New York Times, North Jersey Herald-News and The Denver Post. His work has also appeared in Out Magazine. In 2011, his coming out was named the No. 64 moment in gay sports history by Outsports. His story was included as a chapter in the book Jocks 2: Coming Out to Play by Dan Woog.

=== Literary career ===
Out of the Pocket, his first fiction, won the 2008 Lambda Literary Award for Children's and Young Adult Literature category.

His second novel, Openly Straight, was released in June 2013. It received a strongly positive review in The New York Times, and starred reviews from Booklist and The Bulletin of the Center for Children's Books. The novel won the Sid Fleischman Award for humor and was a finalist for the Amelia Elizabeth Walden Award. It also made Young Adult Library Services Association (YALSA)'s Best Fiction for Young Adults list for 2014; the American Library Association Rainbow Book List; The Texas Library Association's Tayshas List (as a top ten title); and was nominated for the Georgia Peach Award. The novel has been translated into German, Vietnamese, and Portuguese.

The Porcupine of Truth, which came out in June 2015, won the Stonewall Book Award and the PEN Center USA Literary Award. It received starred reviews by Booklist and School Library Journal, and made the Indie Next List, YALSA's Best Fiction for Young Adults list for 2016, Booklist Best of 2015, New York Public Library's Best Book for Teens 2015, Teenreads Favorites of 2015, the 2016 Rainbow List, and the Cooperative Children's Book Center (CCBC) Choices 2016 List.

In March 2016, Konigsberg released Honestly Ben, the sequel to Openly Straight. It received three starred reviews: from Publishers Weekly, Booklist, and School Library Journal. Both novels in the series were released as audio books that month.

Konigsberg's coming-of-age novel The Music of What Happens was released on February 26, 2019. It was named "Best Fiction for Young Adults" in 2020 by YALSA. It also entered the 2020 ALA Rainbow Book List as a Top Ten Title.

In September 2020, the young-adult book The Bridge was released. In December 2020, it was announced that the rights of the book were has acquired by Amazon and that it was to be adapted into a limited series, produced by Amazon Studios in association with PKM Productions. David Mandell is set to adapt the book for television and will write and executive produce, with Konigsberg also executive producing, along with Patrick Moran of PKM.

== Bibliography ==
- Out of the Pocket (2008)
- Openly Straight (2013)
- The Porcupine of Truth (2015)
- Honestly Ben (2016)
- The Music of What Happens (2019)
- The Bridge (2020)
- Destination Unknown (2022)
