= I'll Get There. It Better Be Worth the Trip =

1969 novel by John Donovan

I'll Get There, It Better Be Worth the Trip
- First edition
- Author: John Donovan
- Language: English
- Publisher: Harper & Row
- Publication date: 1969
- Media type: Print (Hardback & Paperback)
- ISBN: 0-440-93980-1

I'll Get There. It Better Be Worth the Trip is a young adult novel by John Donovan, first published in 1969. It was one of the first mainstream teen novels to deal with homosexuality. It was reissued in September 2010 by Flux, an imprint of Llewellyn Worldwide. The novel tells the story of Davy Ross, a lonely boy who becomes close friends with a male classmate at his new school. The friendship later turns sexual, eventually causing Davy to struggle with feelings of guilt.

The novel was the subject of an essay by Martin Wilson in the 2010 book The Lost Library: Gay Fiction Rediscovered.

== Plot summary ==
13-year-old Davy Ross' grandmother, who has raised him from the age of five, dies, forcing Davy and his beloved dachshund Fred to move in with Davy's divorced alcoholic mother in New York City. Davy's mother has difficulty adjusting to the new living situation, and acts resentfully and coldly to her son. Davy's father is more understanding, but also more distant, as he is remarried and sees Davy only sporadically. Davy's only friend is his dog Fred, until he meets Douglas Altschuler, a classmate at his new school who is also an only child living with a single mother. Davy and Altschuler begin spending time together, and eventually kiss, sleep in the same bed with their arms around each other, and engage in other erotic acts (described in the book as "making out" and "doing it", without more details). Davy seems comfortable with these activities until his mother sees the two boys sleeping with their arms around each other and becomes very upset.

Shortly thereafter, Davy's dachshund Fred is hit by a car and killed. Davy now thinks homosexual acts might be wrong in view of his mother's reaction, and wonders if the death of his much-loved dog is punishment for his actions with Altschuler. Davy's feelings of guilt and shame cause a temporary break in the boys' friendship, but in the end they reconcile after Davy is encouraged by his father, who does not share his mother's homophobia.

== Analysis ==
I'll Get There was the subject of a 2014 academic essay 'Navigating Adolescence through the Streets of New York: I'll Get There. It Better Be Worth the Trip' in Children's Literature and New York City (London and New York: Routledge, 2014). It is argued that although the ambiguity at the end of the novel 'does not make visible specifically, and unequivocally positive, gay identity, at a time when such representations were absent from children's literature, the use of the word 'maybe' [in the final exchange] both releases the protagonists from a certain heterosexual future and suggests the possibility of a non-heterosexual future, positioning both futures on equal terms' (p. 53).
