= Brent Hartinger =

American writer

- Born: 1971 (age 54–55); Washington, United States
- Education: Gonzaga University; Western Washington University
- Occupations: Author; playwright; screenwriter
- Spouse: Michael Jensen
- Writing career
- Notable work: Geography Club
- Literary movement: Gay teen fiction
- Website: brenthartinger.com

Brent Hartinger (born 1971) is an American author, playwright, and screenwriter, best known for his novels about gay teenagers.

== Early life ==
Hartinger was born in 1971 in Washington state and grew up in Tacoma, Washington. He earned a bachelor's degree from Gonzaga University in Spokane, Washington, and studied for a master's degree in psychology at Western Washington University.

== Career ==
Hartinger is the author of fourteen novels. His first published book was the young adult novel Geography Club (HarperCollins, 2003). He subsequently published seven companion books to that novel, including The Thing I Didn't Know I Didn't Know (2014); Barefoot in the City of Broken Dreams (2015); The Road to Amazing (2016); and The Otto Digmore Difference (2017). These last four books were written for adults, and include the teen characters from his earlier YA novels as adults in their twenties.

Hartinger's other books, all for young adults, include Grand & Humble (2006); Project Sweet Life (2008); and Three Truths and a Lie (Simon & Schuster, 2016).

A feature film version of Hartinger's first novel, Geography Club, was released in November 2013, co-starring Scott Bakula.

Also a screenwriter, various Hartinger's screenplays have been optioned for film, or are in various stages of production, Project Pay Day, a teen caper movie based on his own novel was released in 2021.

Hartinger's writing honors include the Lambda Literary Award; a GLAAD Media Award; the Scandiuzzi Children's Book Award; and an Edgar Award nomination. Screenwriting awards include the Screenwriting in the Sun Award, a Writers Network Fellowship, and first place in the StoryPros, Fresh Voices, Acclaim, and L.A. Comedy Festival screenwriting contests.

Hartinger has taught creative writing at Vermont College of Fine Arts, and is the co-founder of the entertainment website AfterElton.com, which was sold to MTV/Viacom in 2006.

== Personal life ==
In 1990, Hartinger co-founded one of the world's first LGBT youth support groups, in his hometown of Tacoma, Washington.

Hartinger currently has no permanent address, and instead continuously travels the world with his husband, writer Michael Jensen. Their "digital nomad" journey, which has been featured on CBS Sunday Morning and in Forbes, is documented on their website Brent and Michael Are Going Places.

== Works ==
The Russel Middlebrook Series (a young adult series)

- Geography Club (2003)
- The Order of the Poison Oak (2005)
- Double Feature: Attack of the Soul-Sucking Brain Zombies/Bride of the Soul-Sucking Brain Zombies (2007)
- The Elephant of Surprise (2013)

Russel Middlebrook: The Futon Years (an adult series)

- The Thing I Didn't Know I Didn't Know (2014)
- Barefoot in the City of Broken Dreams (2015)
- The Road to Amazing (2016)

The Otto Digmore Series (an adult series)

- The Otto Digmore Difference (2017)
- The Otto Digmore Decision (2020)

Other Books

- The Last Chance Texaco (2004)
- Grand & Humble (2006)
- Project Sweet Life (2009)
- Shadow Walkers (2011)
- Three Truths and a Lie (2016)
- Infinite Drift (2025)
