= Lists of bisexual people =

This is a list of bisexual people, specifically notable people who identify as bisexual and deceased people who have been identified as bisexual.

The list is divided into the following sections:

- List of bisexual people (A–F)
- List of bisexual people (G–M)
- List of bisexual people (N–S)
- List of bisexual people (T–Z)
