= List of bisexual people (N–S) =

This list of bisexual people includes notable people who identify or have been identified as bisexual.

== N ==
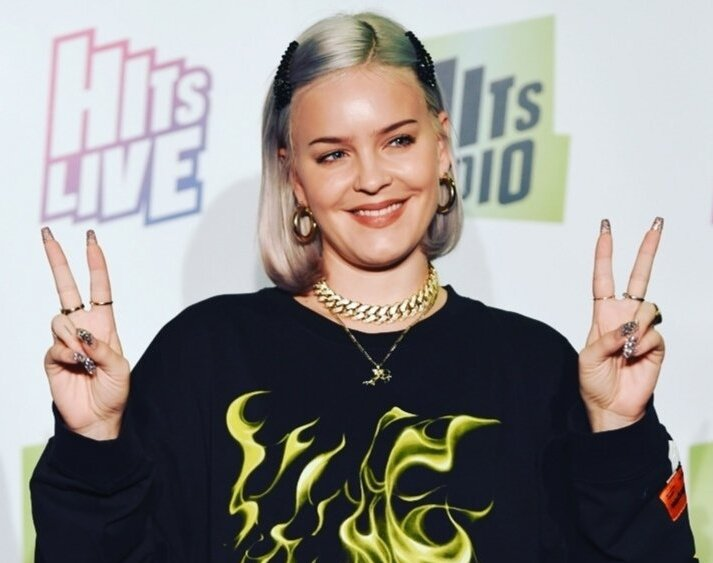
Singer Anne-Marie

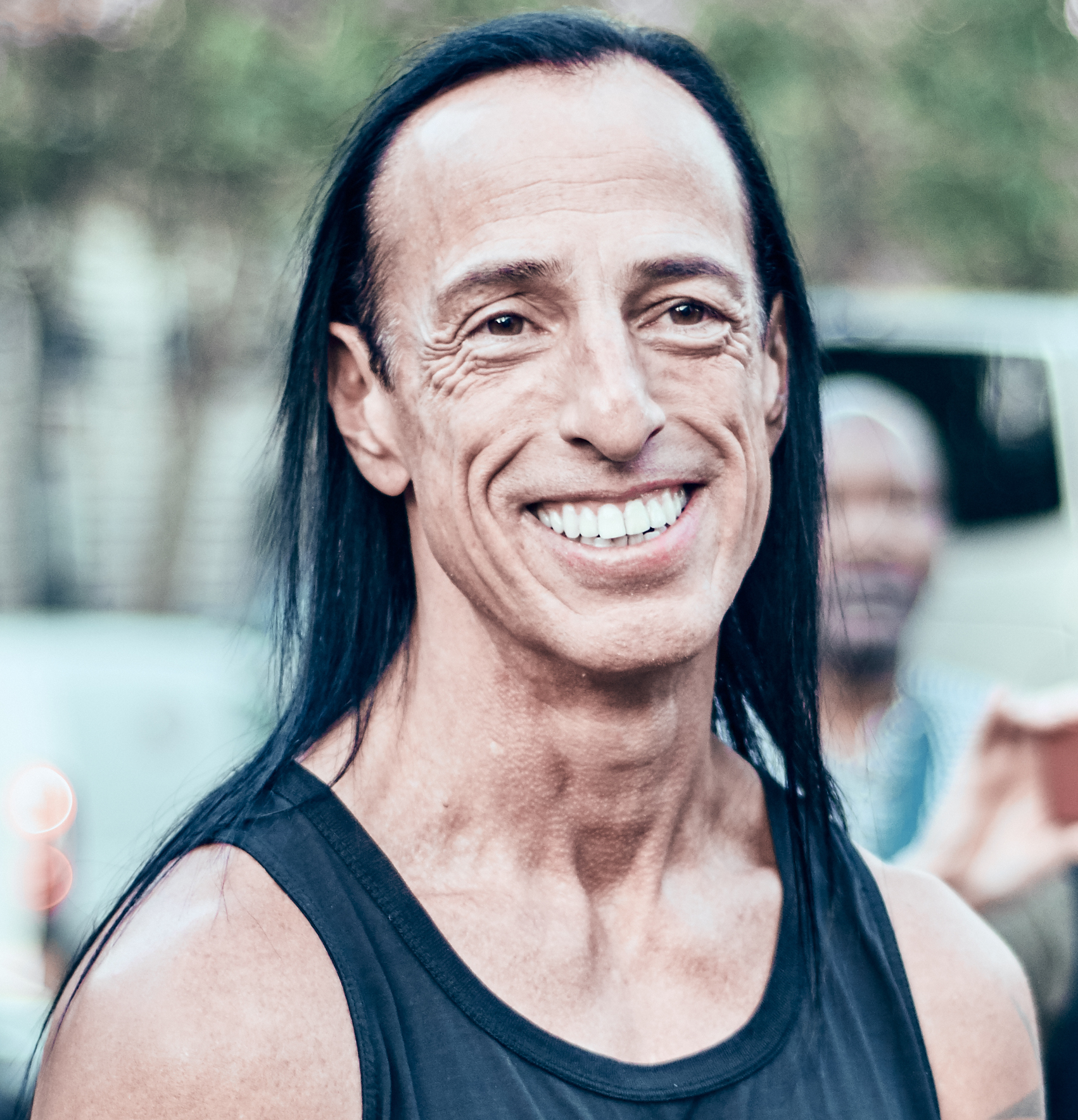
Fashion designer Rick Owens

Name	Dates	Nationality	Comments	Reference
Bif Naked	born 1971	Canadian	Musician	
Kate Nash	born 1987	British	Musician	
Bernard Natan	1886–1942	French, Romanian	Early pornographic film actor and director; later worked in mainstream cinema; died in Auschwitz	
Alla Nazimova	1879–1945	Russian-American	Crimean-born actress	
Meshell Ndegeocello	born 1968	American	German-born musician	
Louise Nevelson	1899–1988	Ukrainian	Kyiv-born American artist	
Anne-Marie Nicholson	born 1991	English	Musician	
Precious Paula Nicole	born 1986	Filipino	Drag performer	
Harold Nicolson	1886–1968	English	Diplomat, author, politician, husband of bisexual Vita Sackville-West	
Anaïs Nin	1903–1977	American	Writer born in France	
Cynthia Nixon	born 1966	American	Actress	
Nica Noelle	born 1976	American	Pornographic actress, adult film director, sex columnist, and businesswoman	
Rosaleen Norton	1917–1979	Australian	Artist and occultist	
Tegan Nox	born 1994	Welsh	Professional wrestler	
Laura Nyro	1947–1997	American	Musician	

== O ==
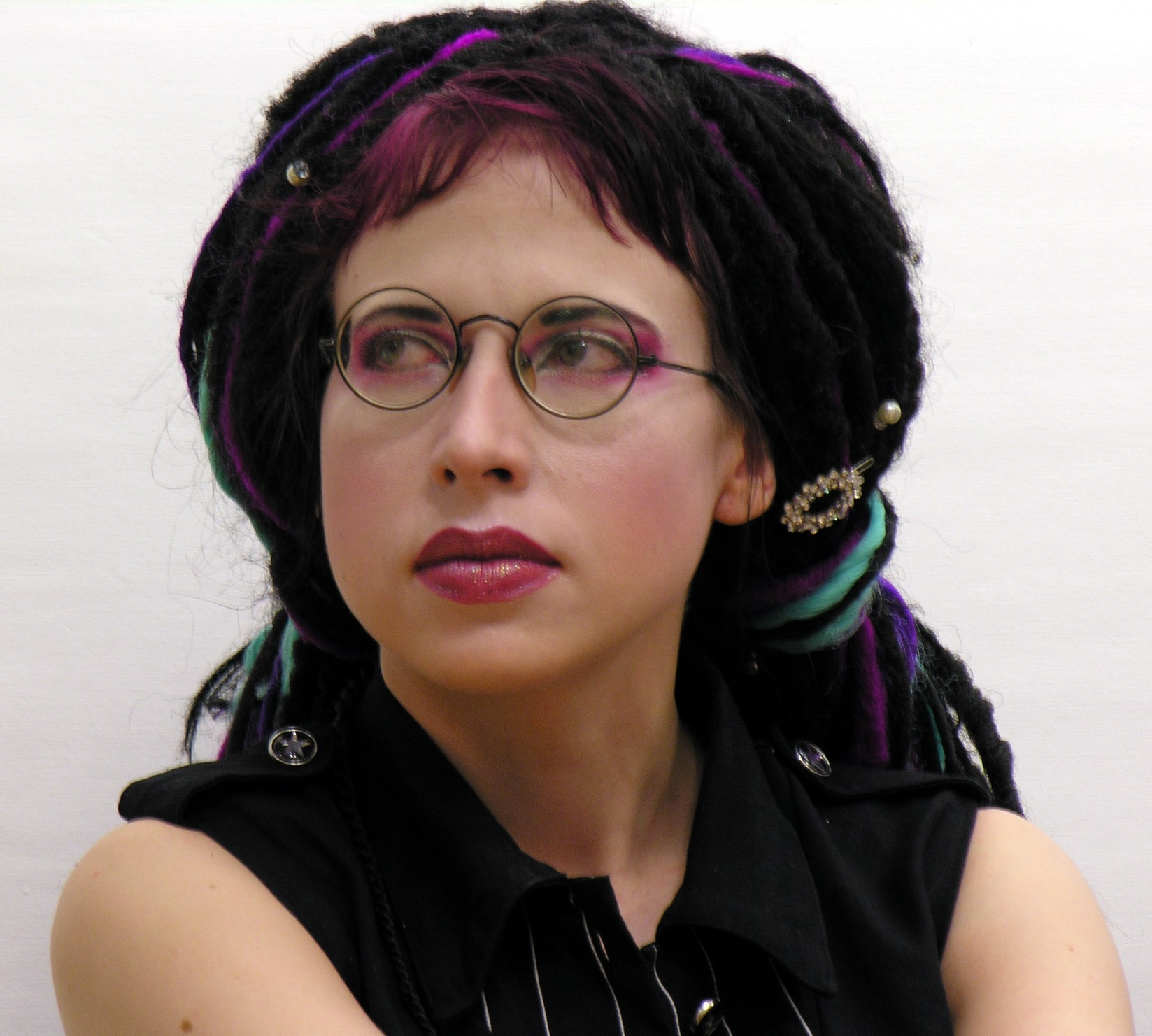
Writer Sofi Oksanen

Name	Dates	Nationality	Comments	Reference
Frank Ocean	born 1987	American	Rapper, singer	
Robyn Ochs	born 1958	American	Writer and activist	
Nuala O'Faolain	1942–2008	Irish	Writer	
Sofi Oksanen	born 1977	Finnish	Writer	
Musa Okwonga	born 1979	British	Writer and musician	
Laurence Olivier	1907–1989	British	Actor	
Bree Olson	born 1986	American	Pornographic actress and adult model	
April O'Neil	born 1987	American	Pornographic actress	
Alfred d'Orsay	1801–1852	French	Amateur artist, dandy, and man of fashion	
Joan Osborne	born 1962	American	Musician	
Rick Owens	born 1962	American	Fashion designer	

== P ==
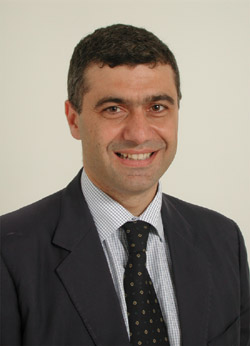
Italian politician, lawyer and journalist Alfonso Pecoraro Scanio

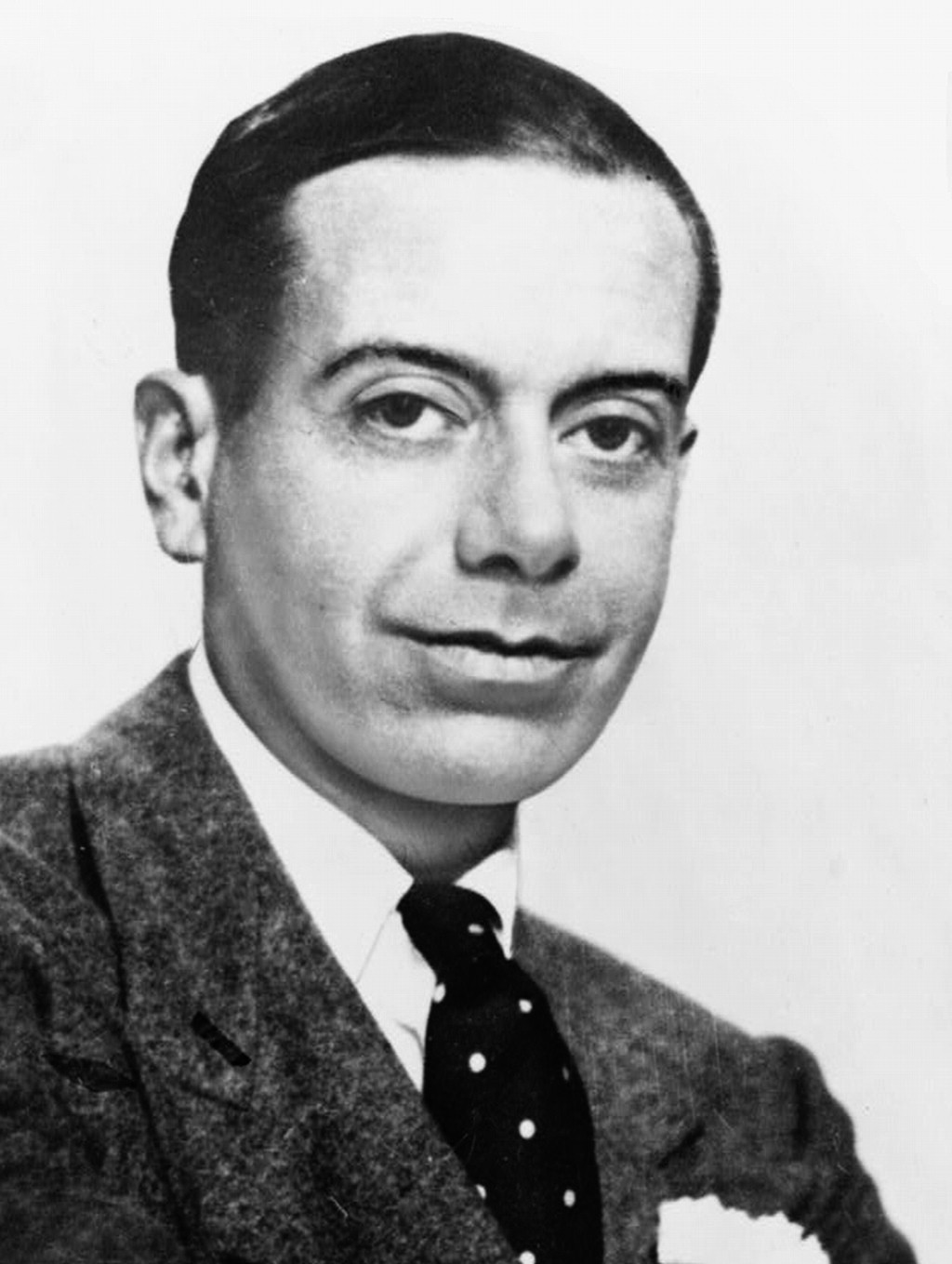
Composer and songwriter Cole Porter

Name	Dates	Nationality	Comments	Reference
Svante Pääbo	born 1955	Swedish	Evolutionary geneticist, head of the Max Planck Institute for Evolutionary Anthropology's Neanderthal genome project	
Lady Caroline Paget	1913–1973	British	Socialite, actress, married to bisexual Sir Michael Duff	
Camille Paglia	born 1947	American	Writer and academic	
Anita Pallenberg	born 1944	German	Model, actress and fashion designer	
Amanda Palmer	born 1976	American	Lead singer and pianist of The Dresden Dolls	
Marco Pannella	born 1930	Italian	Politician	
Anna Paquin	born 1982	New Zealander	Actress	
Sergei Parajanov	1924–1990	Armenian	Soviet film-maker	
Elaine Parent	1942–2002	American	"World's most wanted woman"	
Betty Parsons	1900–1982	American	Artist and gallery owner	
Peaches	born 1968	Canadian	Musician	
Alfonso Pecoraro Scanio	born 1959	Italian	Politician	
Katharine Philips	1631–1664	English	Poet	
Édith Piaf	1915–1963	French	Singer, alleged lover of Marlene Dietrich	
Patrice Pike	born 1970	American	Singer	
Aubrey Plaza	born 1984	American	Actress and comedian	
Pocah	born 1994	Brazilian	Singer-songwriter	
Mimi Pollak	1903–1999	Swedish	Actress and director; love of Greta Garbo's life	
Cole Porter	1891–1964	American	Composer and songwriter	
Dawn Porter	born 1979	British	Television presenter; "I have had sexual experiences with girls before, and am quite open about it."	
Liane de Pougy	1869–1950	French	Dancer and courtesan	
Vincent Price	1911–1993	American	Actor	

== Q ==
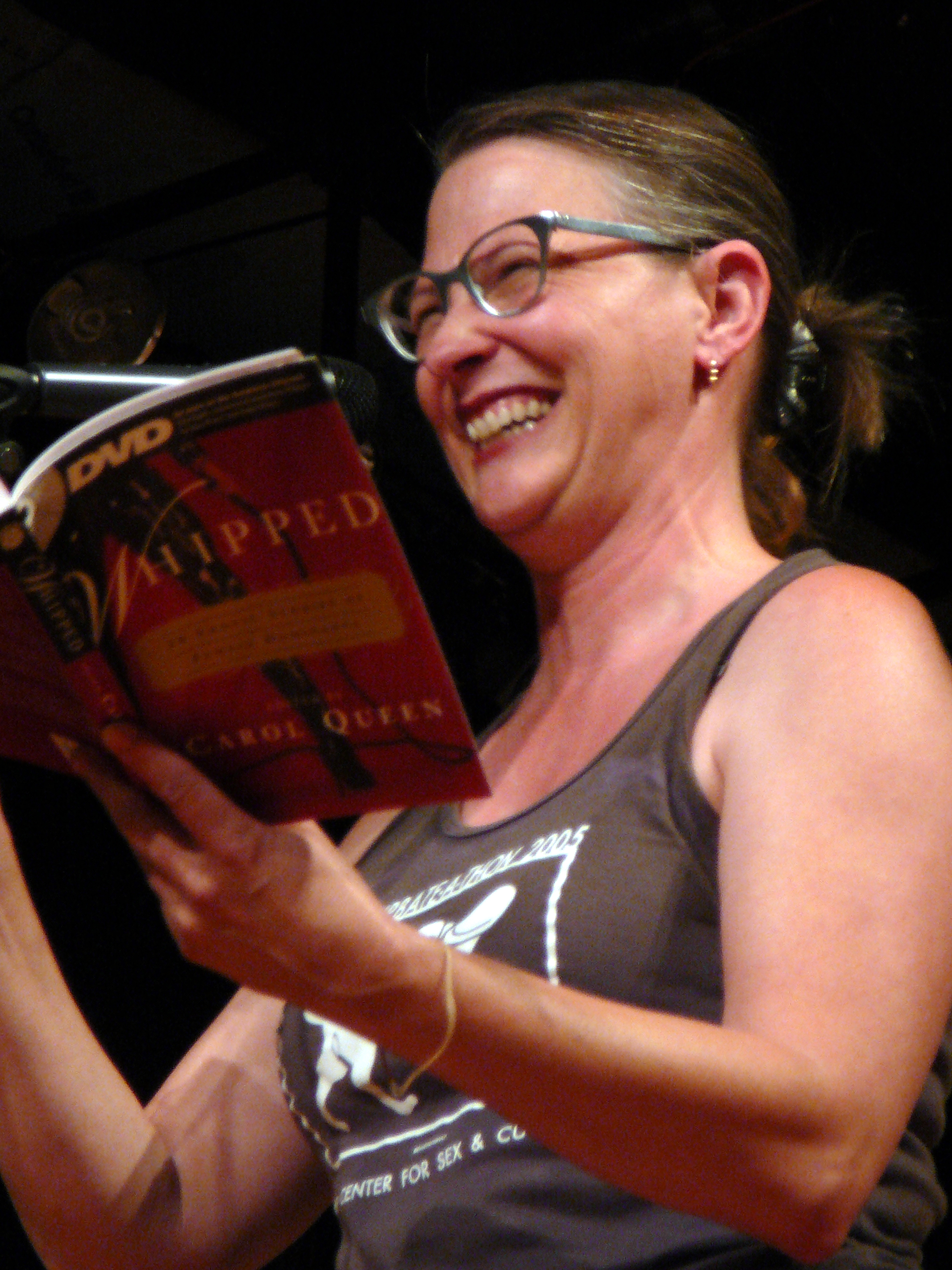
Author, editor, sociologist, and sexologist Carol Queen

Name	Dates	Nationality	Comments	Reference
Carol Queen	born 1958	American	Author, editor, sociologist, sexologist, feminist, and pornographic actress	

== R ==
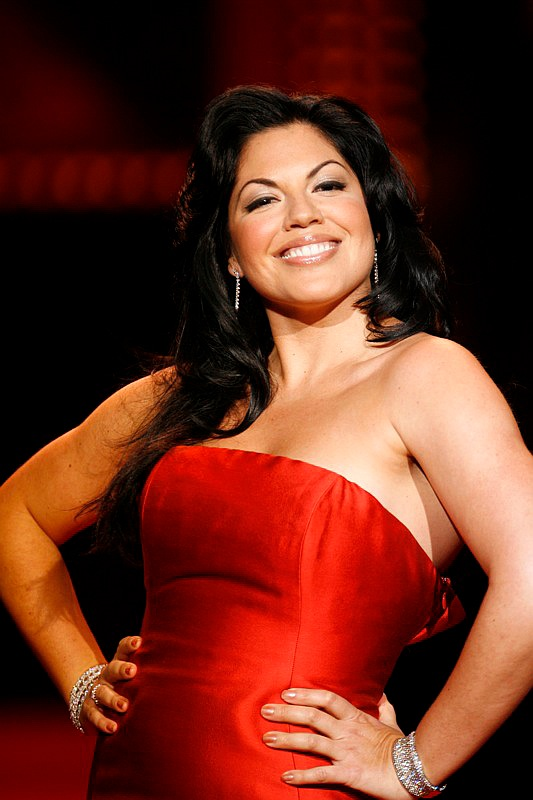
Actor and singer Sara Ramirez

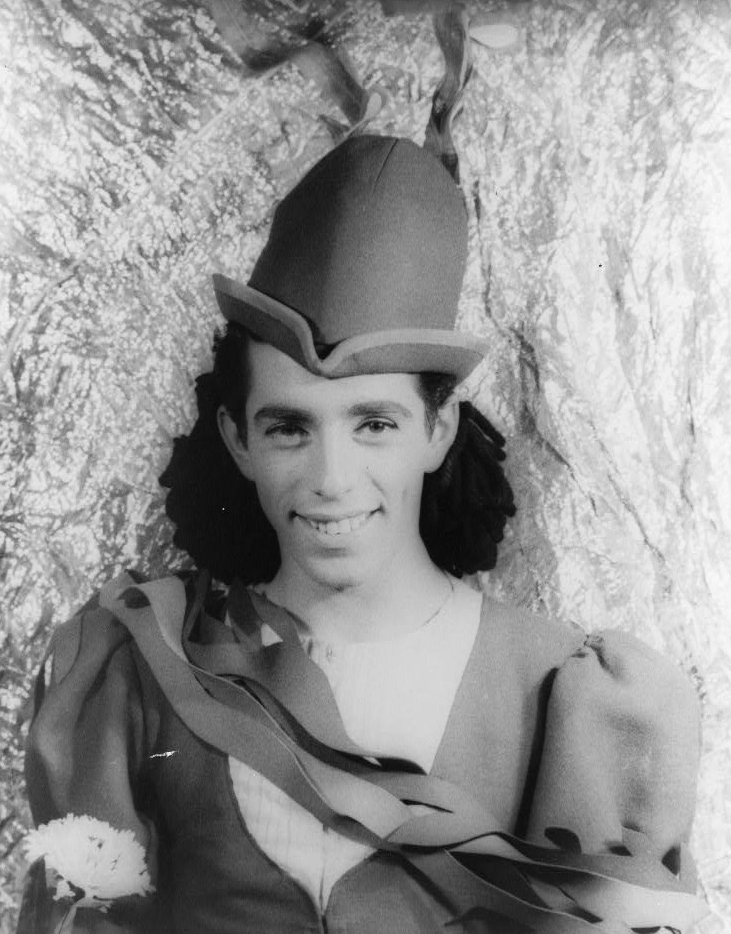
Choreographer Jerome Robbins

Name	Dates	Nationality	Comments	Reference
Ma Rainey	1886–1939	American	Blues singer	
Natacha Rambova	1897–1966	American	Rudolph Valentino's wife	
Sara Ramirez	born 1975	Mexican–American	Actress, singer-songwriter	
Dee Dee Ramone	1951–2002	American	Musician	
Anthony Rapp	born 1971	American	Actor, known for his role in the musical Rent	
Simon Raven	1927–2001	English	Writer	
Johnnie Ray	1927–1990	American	Singer, songwriter, and pianist	
Pauline Réage	1907–1998	French	Author of Story of O	
Michael Redgrave	1908–1985	English	Actor	
Lou Reed	1942–2013	American	Musician	
Mikhaela Reid	born 1980	American	Cartoonist	
Lili Reinhart	born 1996	American	Actress	
Tony Richardson	1928–1991	English	Film director	
Arthur Rimbaud	1854–1891	French	Poet	
Jerome Robbins	1918–1998	American	Choreographer of West Side Story	
Elizabeth Robins	1862–1952	American	Actress, playwright, novelist	
Tom Robinson	born 1950	British	Musician and broadcaster	
Michelle Rodriguez	born 1978	American	Actress	
Martin Rossiter	born 1970	Welsh	Musician, formerly with band Gene	
Ida Rubinstein	1885–1960	Russian	Dancer and Belle Époque beauty	
Muriel Rukeyser	1913–1980	American	Poet	
Joshua Rush	born 2001	American	Actor	
Ryan Russell	born 1992	American	American football player	
Renato Russo	1960–1996	Brazilian	Singer/songwriter with Legião Urbana	
Lee Ryan	born 1983	British	Singer, member of boy band Blue	
Sara Ryan	born 1971	American	Writer	

== S ==
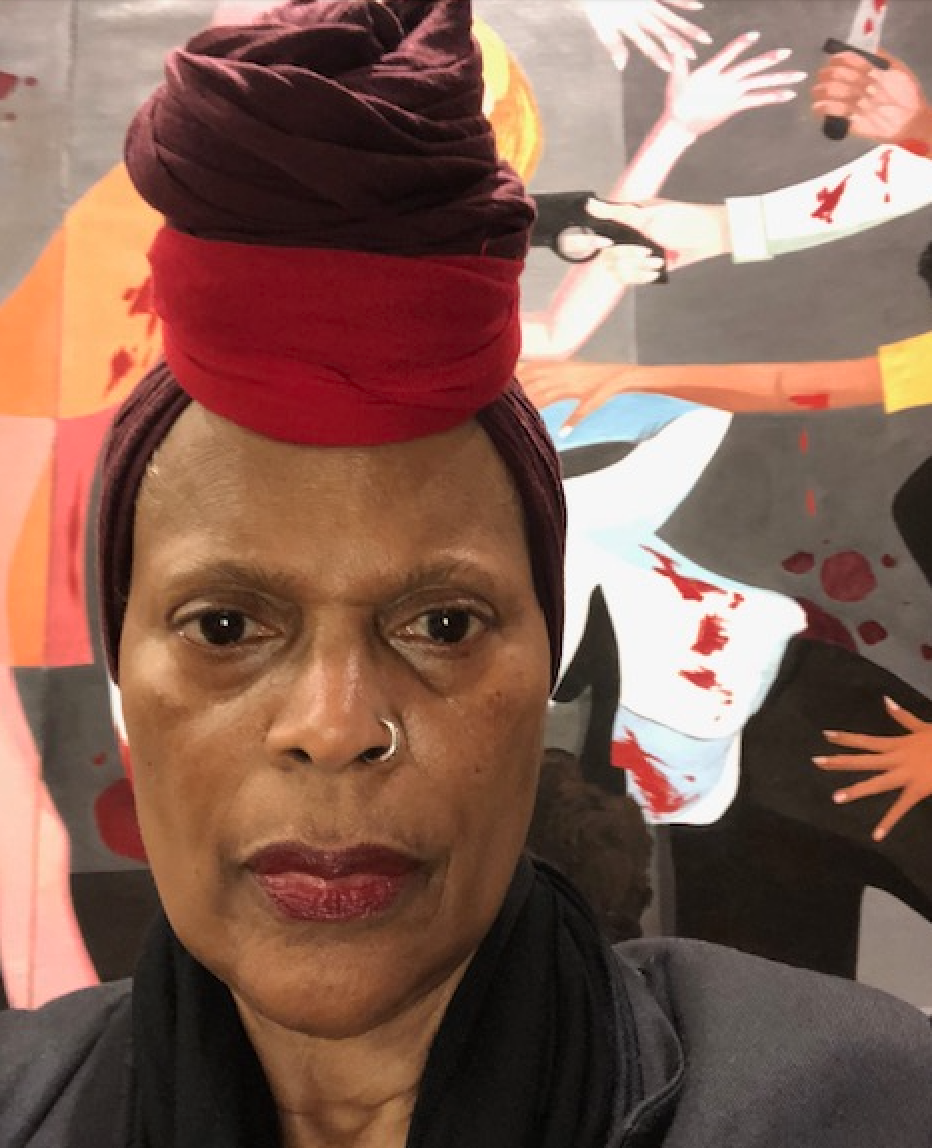
Author and performance poet Sapphire

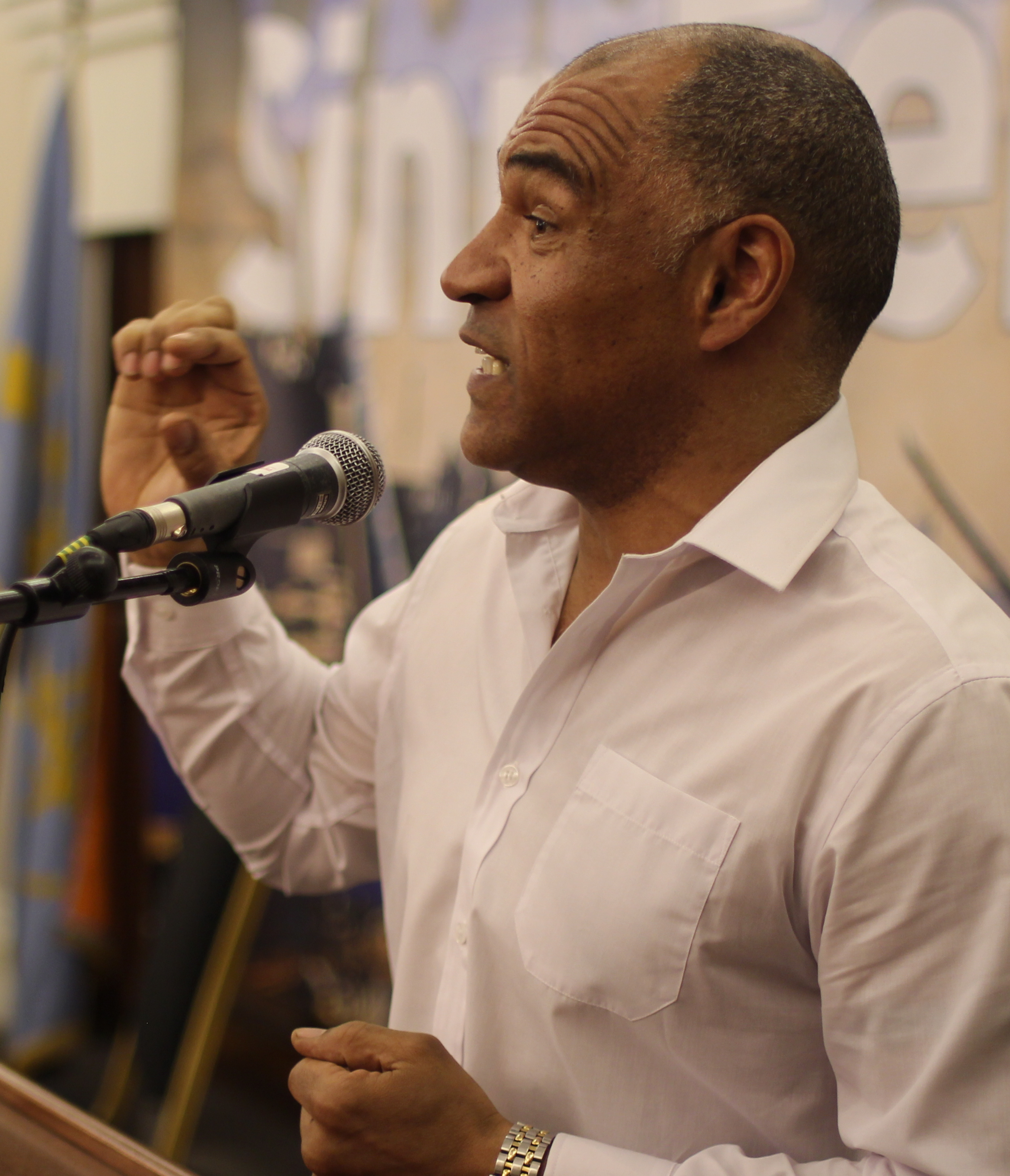
Artist and political activist Kevin Sharkey

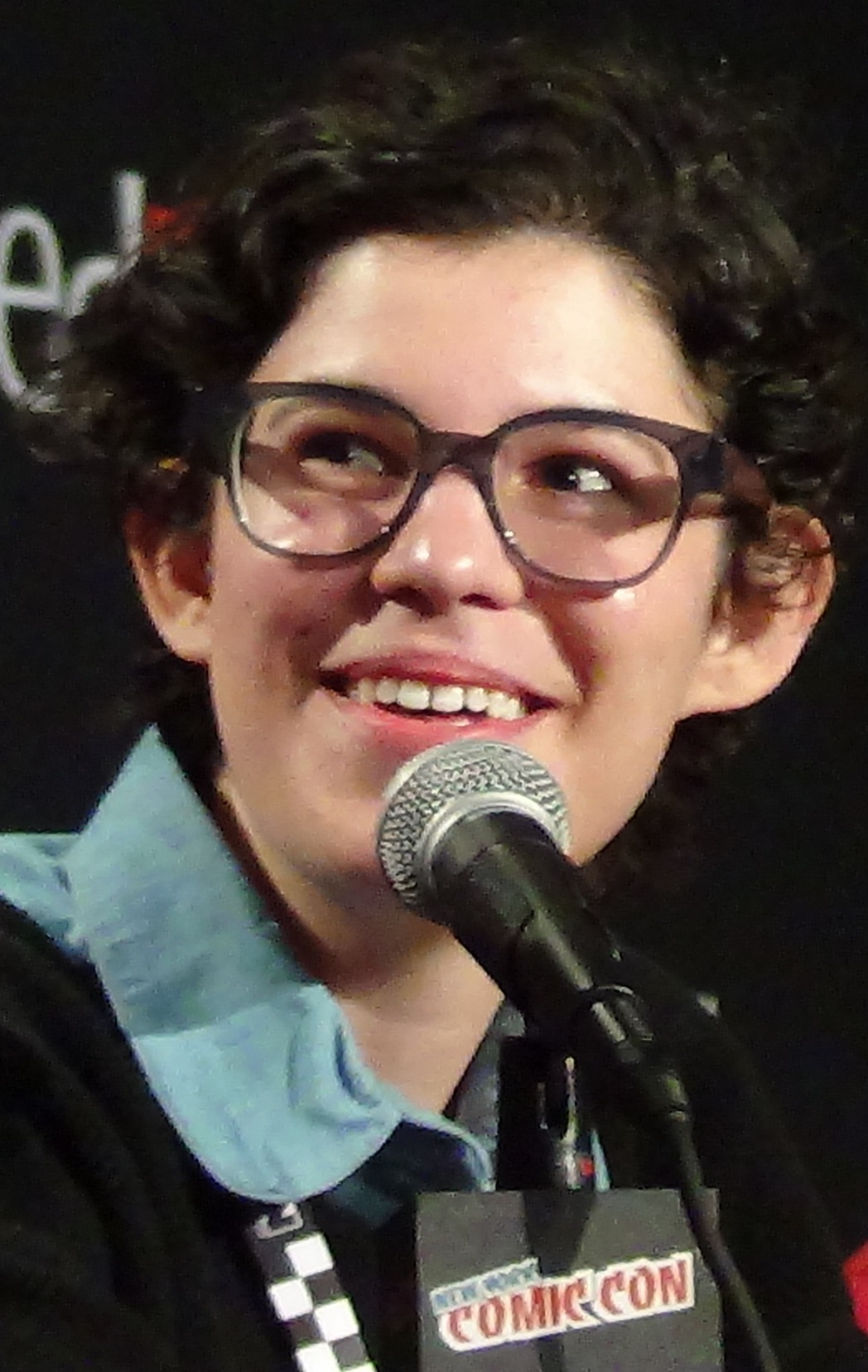
Animator, director, screenwriter and producer Rebecca Sugar

Author and editor Ron Suresha

Name	Dates	Nationality	Comments	Reference
Umberto Saba	1883–1957	Italian	Poet	
Jaime Sáenz	1921–1986	Bolivian	Poet, novelist, and short story writer	
Françoise Sagan	1935–2004	French	Playwright, novelist (Bonjour Tristesse), screenwriter	
Rachael Sage	born 1971	American	Songwriter	
Pam St. Clement	born 1942	English	Actress on EastEnders	
Ali Saleem	born 1981	Pakistani	Television host, actor, scriptwriter and impressionist	
Ola Salo	born 1977	Swedish	Singer with The Ark	
Ève Salvail	born 1973	Canadian	Model	
George Sand	1804–1876	French	Writer	
Sapphire	born 1950	American	Writer	
Savannah	1970–1994	American	Pornographic actress; had affairs with men and women in her personal life	
Elly Schlein	born 1985	Italian	Politician	
Maria Schneider	1952–2011	French	Actress	
Annette Schwarz	born 1984	German	Pornographic actress, adult model, and businesswoman	
Ann Scott	born 1965	French	Writer, model	
Paul Scott	1920–1978	English	Writer (The Raj Quartet)	
Self Esteem (Rebecca Lucy Taylor)	born 1986	British	Musician, songwriter and actress	
Stephanie Sellars	born 1976	American	Columnist (New York Press), writer, actress, singer	
Vikram Seth	born 1952	Indian	Author and poet	
Kevin Sharkey	born 1962	Irish	Painter and celebrity	
Alia Shawkat	born 1989	American	Actress	
Pete Shelley	1955–2018	British	Singer, songwriter and guitarist with the Buzzcocks	
Michelle Shocked	born 1962	American	Musician	
Nerina Shute	1908–2004	English	Writer	
Sia	born 1975	Australian	Musician, voice actress, producer	
Kate Siegel	born 1982	American	Actress, screenwriter	
Judee Sill	1944–1979	American	Musician	
Kyrsten Sinema	born 1976	American	Politician (United States Senate - Dem/Ind)	
Lilly Singh	born 1988	Canadian	Actress, comedian, YouTube personality	
Liz Smith	born 1923	American	Gossip columnist	
Jill Sobule	1961-2025	American	Musician	
Susan Sontag	1933–2004	American	Writer, filmmaker, and activist	
Anna Span	born 1971	English	Porn director, politician	
Humphrey Spender	1910–2005	English	Photographer, artist, architect, brother of Stephen	
Stephen Spender	1909–1995	English	Poet, novelist and essayist, brother of Humphrey	
Dusty Springfield	1939–1999	English	Singer	
Stacia	born 1952	Irish	"Happily bisexual" dancer for rock group Hawkwind	
Barbara Stanwyck	1907–1990	American	Actress	
Kinnie Starr	born 1970	Canadian	Musician	
Jan Steckel	born 1962	American	Writer	
Marc Stevens	1943–1989	American	Pornographic actor, erotic dancer, and memoirist	
Jamie Stewart	born 1978	American	Frontman of American experimental group Xiu Xiu	
Steve Strange	1959–2015	Welsh	Musician, singer with Visage	
Rebecca Sugar	born 1987	American	Animator, screenwriter and musician, creator of Steven Universe	
India Summer	born 1975	American	Pornographic actress and adult model	
Ron Suresha	born 1958	American	Editor of Bi Men: Coming Out, a Lammy Award finalist	
Jacqueline Susann	1918–1974	American	Author of Valley of the Dolls	
