= Superstars (novel) =

Book by Ann Scott

- Cover of Superstars
- Author: Ann Scott
- Language: French
- Genre: Fiction
- Publisher: Flammarion
- Publication date: November 19, 2000
- Publication place: France
- Media type: Print (Hardcover)
- Pages: 310
- ISBN: 978-2-08-067837-9
- OCLC: 45885363

Superstars, published in France in 2000 by Flammarion and translated in several languages, is the second novel by Ann Scott. Relating the tales of the techno culture emerging in France and in Europe in the late nineties, this pop novel instantly gave its author a cult status.

== Plot summary ==
This novel, set in Paris, portrays the economically bleak and emotionally taut lives of three roommates craving artistic recognition and fame. Amid trendy raves, glamorous parties, borderline sex, and designer drugs, Louise, the main character, who has recently turned thirty, is facing an identity crisis: she now has a record contract as a techno producer, but she used to be a bass player for rock bands, and she can't decide which world means more to her. But when she entered the world of electronic music and raves, she also entered the lesbian world, or at least the bisexual world, and now she's wondering where all of this is leading her.

== Literary significance ==
An entire generation found itself represented in these dilemmas of heterosexual vs bisexual identity and rock vs techno tastes.

This novel pays tribute to 70s rock icons like The Rolling Stones, punk musicians like Johnny Thunders, and globally renowned DJs like Jeff Mills, Kevin Saunderson, and DJ Rush. It also pays tribute to the pioneering French female musician DJ Sextoy who died in 2002.

Certain gay and lesbian groups in France criticized the novel for depicting a very ironic portrait of lesbian lifestyles.

As of 2026, the novel is now translated into English by Jonathan Woolen for Astra Publishing House (USA) and Pushkin Press (UK).

== Editions ==
- Hardback : Editions Flammarion, October 2000 (ISBN 978-2-08-067837-9)
- Paperback : Editions J'ai lu, April 2002 (ISBN 978-2-290-31816-4)
