= Lara Abdallat =

Jordanian beauty contestant and hacker

Lara Abdallat (born 1981 or 1982) is a Jordanian activist, hacker, and former beauty queen.

She was crowned Miss Jordan in 2010 and was the first runner-up in the Miss Arab beauty contest in 2011.

Her online activism began following the release the video of the execution of Jordanian pilot Muath al-Kasaesbeh and the 2015 attack on French satirical magazine Charlie Hebdo, though elsewhere she has stated that she first reached out to hacktivists in November 2014.

She is part of the hacktivist groups CtrlSec, and "Ghost Security" (GSG), which work to block or suspend Twitter accounts, hack websites, and have propaganda videos removed from sites when these posts, tweets, or videos promote Islamic fundamentalist groups such as ISIS, Boko Haram, Al-Qaeda, Al-Nusra, and Al-Shabaab. In November 2015, some members of Ghost Security decided to cooperate with government security forces, while others wanted to continue the anti-government stance of its parent organization Anonymous. Abdallat chose to side the former, and this branch of the group was renamed "Ghost Security Group." The group states that alerting governmental counterterrorist organizations stopped a potential attack in 2015 in Times Square and another in Tunisia. Of GSG's role in preventing these incidents, Abdallat said: "I want to tell you, I got goosebumps that day. It was like my joy [from it was] more than delivering a baby to this world. I felt this more intensely."

She has also said that she only desires to use her hacktivism against terrorist organizations: "We would only ever hack in a humanitarian way. We would never use it in a way to disturb normal individuals or governments."

Abdallat is the only member of Ghost Security Group whose identity is public, and according to articles published in 2015, is its only Muslim member.

Her goals seem to be both to save lives and to provide the world with another view of Islam. She stated in an interview with Mic: "Islam is a peaceful religion. Nothing in it says we should take souls. A soul is something very precious." Elsewhere, she has said: "They are committing crimes that are against Islam – they are destroying the image of our religion, and I wanted to do my part to stop them."

She has also engaged in public disagreements with or protests against Islamic State via Twitter.

Her father is Jordanian and her mother is Turkish-Syrian.
