= Ann Scott (French novelist) =

French writer (born 1965)

- Ann Scott in 2023
- Born: 3 November 1965 (age 60); Paris, France
- Occupation: Novelist
- Writing career
- Genre: Fiction
- Movement: Postmodern
- Website: annscott.fr

Ann Scott (born 3 November 1965) is a French novelist. She is regarded as a social realist for her novels which paint portraits of contemporary youth and her second novel Superstars has given her a cult status in France.

She was awarded the Prix Renaudot in 2023.

== Biography ==
She was born and raised in Paris, France. Her mother is a Russian photographer and her father is a French businessman and art collector.

During the mid-eighties, at age 17, she left home and moved to London, England, where she became a musician, playing drums with local rock bands. She then later turned to fashion modelling for two years and was one of the first tattooed fashion models to break through in prêt-à-porter and couture in the eighties. Then at 21, on her return to Paris, she started writing fiction.

She is now the author of ten novels including Superstars which has become cult and has been translated in several countries, including in the United States and the United Kingdom in 2026. Her 8th novel Cortex depicts a domestic terrorist attack at the Academy Awards ceremony in Los Angeles and parts ways with her previous themes. The follow-up, La Grâce et les ténèbres (Grace and Darkness), highlights cyber-surveillance and the fight against jihadist propaganda on social networks alongside a group of French citizens named the Katiba des Narvalos.

Her last novel, Les Insolents, published in 2023, is about living in solitude by the sea and has won her the Prix Renaudot in France.

She co-wrote Paradize for the French band Indochine for their album of the same title which sold over a million copies in France.

== Personal life ==
She has been romantically involved with several rock musicians and is also known to have had bisexual affairs. She dated French deejay Sextoy for three years, to whom she paid tribute after her death in her second novel Superstars.

Before she became published, she shared a flat in Paris with French writer Virginie Despentes. She was close friends to Daul Kim and Lee Alexander McQueen and paid them tribute in the French magazine Libération.

== Controversy ==
In 2000, she was strongly rejected by a part of the French gay and lesbian community after declaring on the set of French TV show Nulle Part Ailleurs that she found homosexuality "immature": "Being bisexual has often brought some kind of balance to my life, but having strict homosexual relationships led to pathological experiences for me".

== Bibliography ==
Published (in French)	Original title
1996	Asphyxie
2000	Superstars translated into English in 2026 by Jonathan Woolen for Astra Publishing House (USA) and Pushkin Press (UK).
2002	Poussières d'anges
2004	Le pire des mondes
2005	Héroïne
2008	Les chewing gums ne sont pas biodégradables
2010	A la folle jeunesse
2017	Cortex
2020	La Grâce et les ténèbres
2023	Les Insolents
