= List of bisexual people (T–Z) =

List of bisexual people including famous people who identify as bisexual and deceased people who have been identified as bisexual.

== T ==
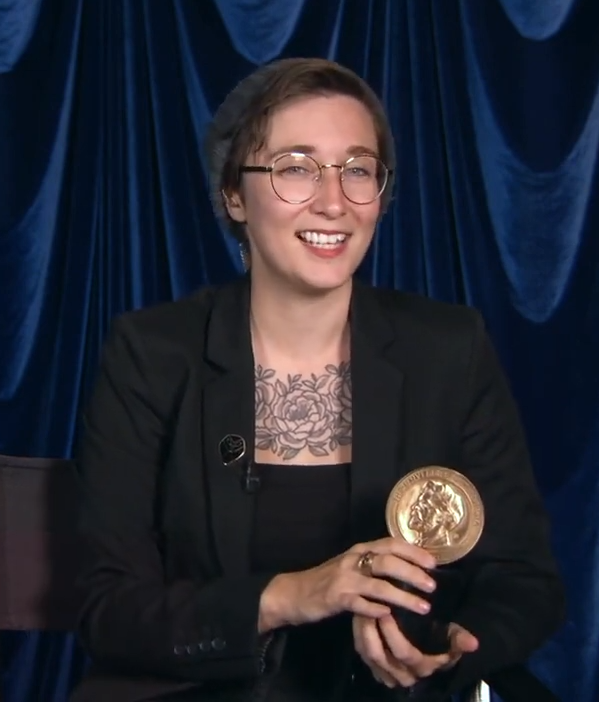
Cartoonist, animator, writer, director, producer, and voice actress Dana Terrace

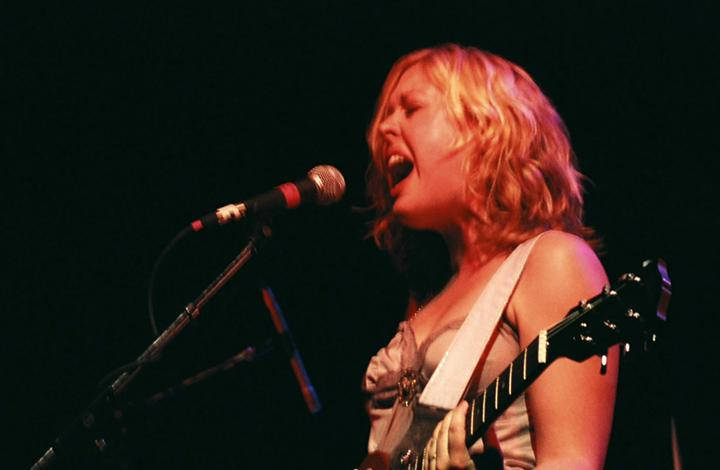
Musician Corin Tucker

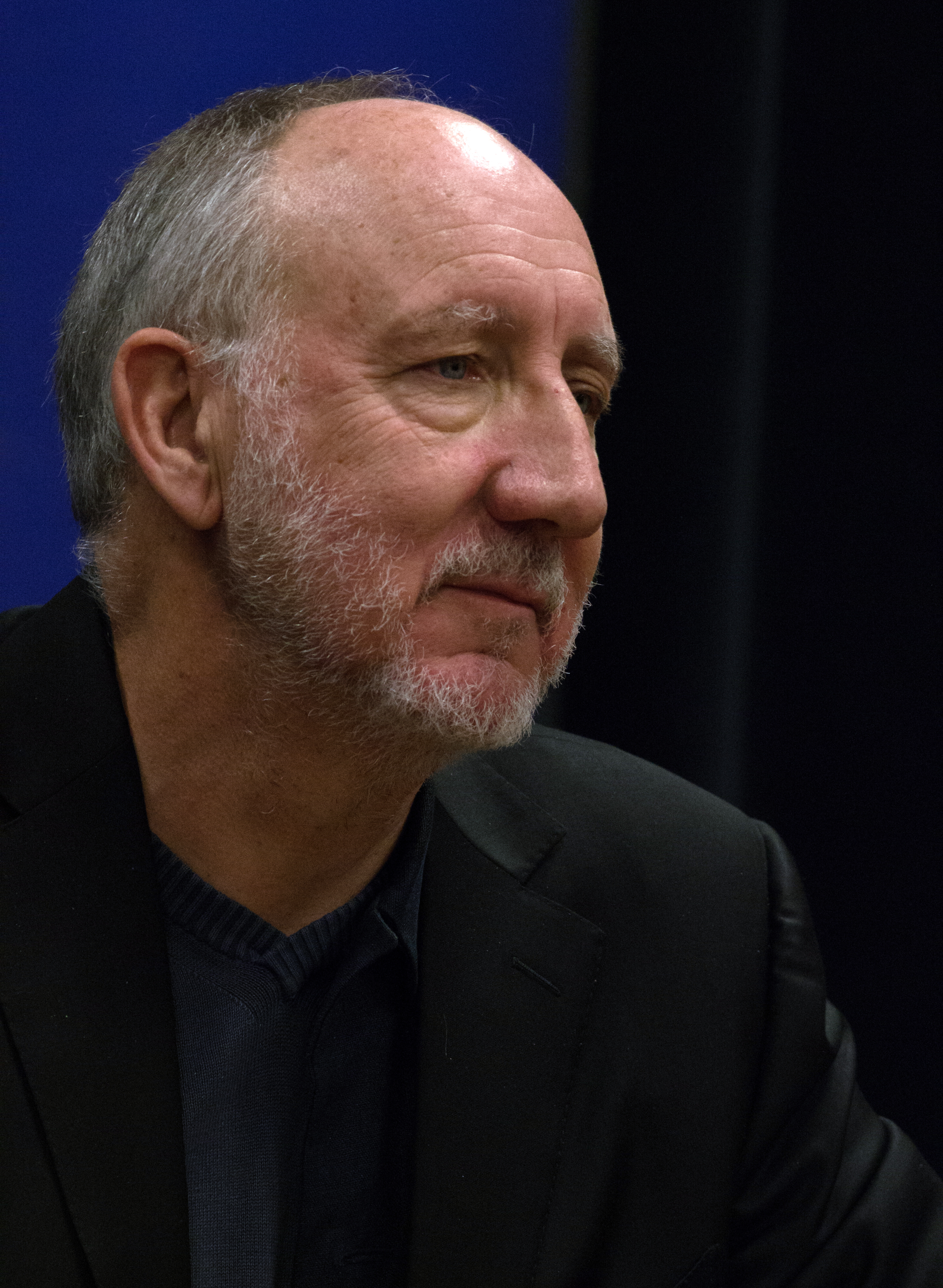
Musician Pete Townshend

Name	Dates	Nationality	Comments	Reference
Kobe Tai	born 1972	American	Pornographic actress, adult model, and erotic dancer	
Cecilia Tan	born 1967	American	Erotic writer and activist	
Laurette Taylor	1884–1946	American	Actress	
Paul Taylor	born 1930	American	Choreographer	
Rebecca Lucy Taylor (more commonly known under the stage name Self Esteem)	born 1986	British	Singer-songwriter	
Sara Teasdale	1884–1933	American	Poet	
Dana Terrace	born 1990	American	Storyboard artist, animator, producer	
Paul Thek	1933–1988	American	Artist	
Dorothy Thompson	1893–1961	American	Journalist; wife of Sinclair Lewis, lover of Christa Winsloe	
Dame Sybil Thorndike	1882–1976	English	Actress	
Bella Thorne	born 1997	American	Actress and singer; former Disney Channel starlet	
Brenton Thwaites	born 1989	Australian	Actor	
Chuck Tingle	Unknown	American	Pseudonymous author of gay niche erotica	
Pete Townshend	born 1945	English	Singer and guitarist for The Who	
P. L. Travers	1899–1996	Australian	Writer, actress, journalist; creator of Mary Poppins	
Ronald Tree	1897–1976	British	American-born journalist, investor, Conservative MP	
Chögyam Trungpa	1939–1987	Tibetan	Buddhist meditation master, artist, Trungpa tülku	
Marina Tsvetaeva	1892–1941	Russian	Poet	
Corin Tucker	born 1972	American	Lead singer and guitarist for the band Sleater-Kinney	
Katie Tupper		Canadian	Soul, rhythm and blues singer-songwriter	
Tyler, the Creator	born 1991	American	Rapper and singer	

== U ==
Name	Dates	Nationality	Comments	Reference
Katie Underwood	born 1975	Australian	Musician and actress formerly with Bardot	
Mocha Uson	born 1985	Filipino	Blogger, singer, and politician	

== V ==
Name	Dates	Nationality	Comments	Reference
Conrad Veidt	1893–1943	German	Actor	
Gore Vidal	1925–2012	American	Writer	
Thea Vidale	born 1956	American	Stand-up comedian, actress and former professional wrestling valet	

== W ==
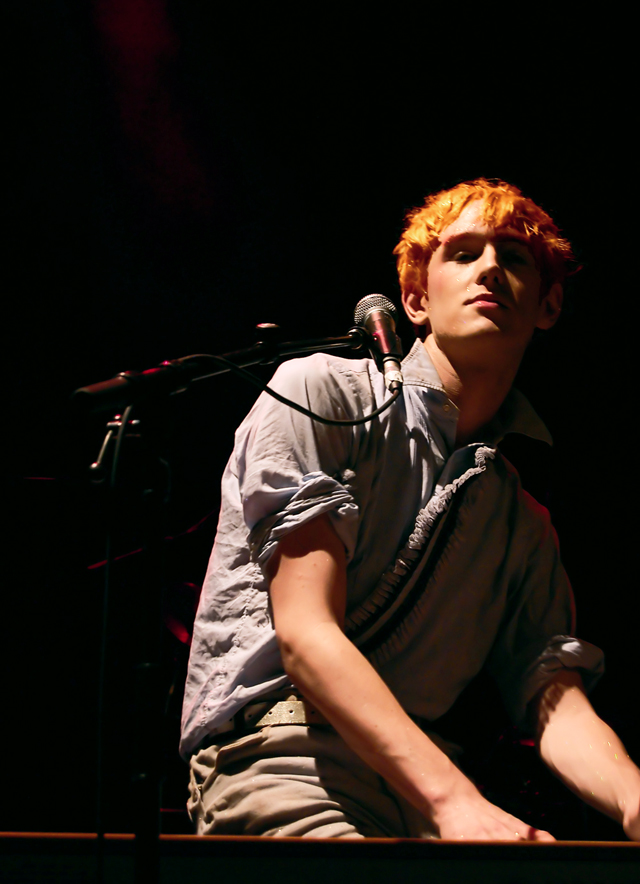
Musician Patrick Wolf

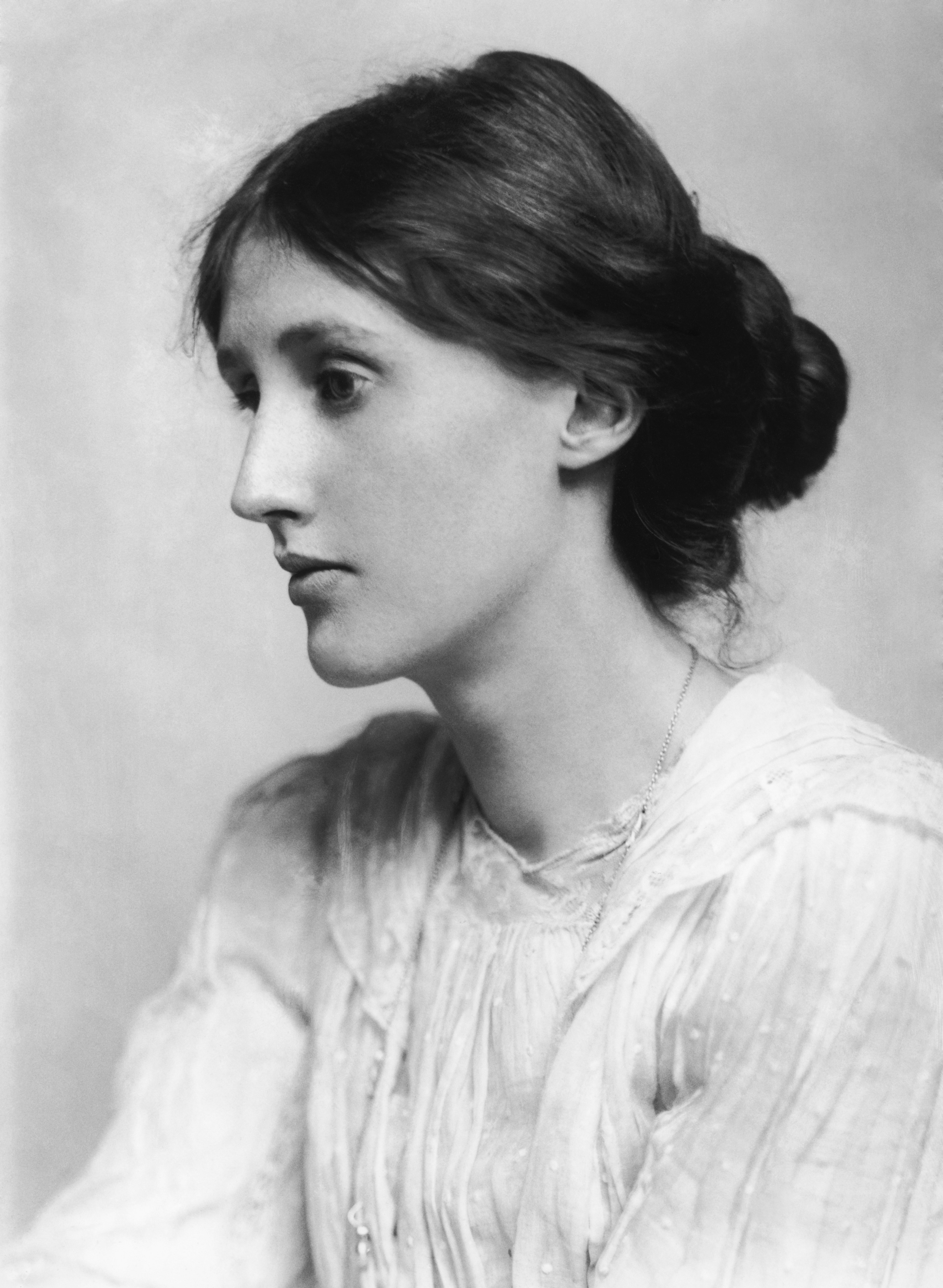
Writer Virginia Woolf

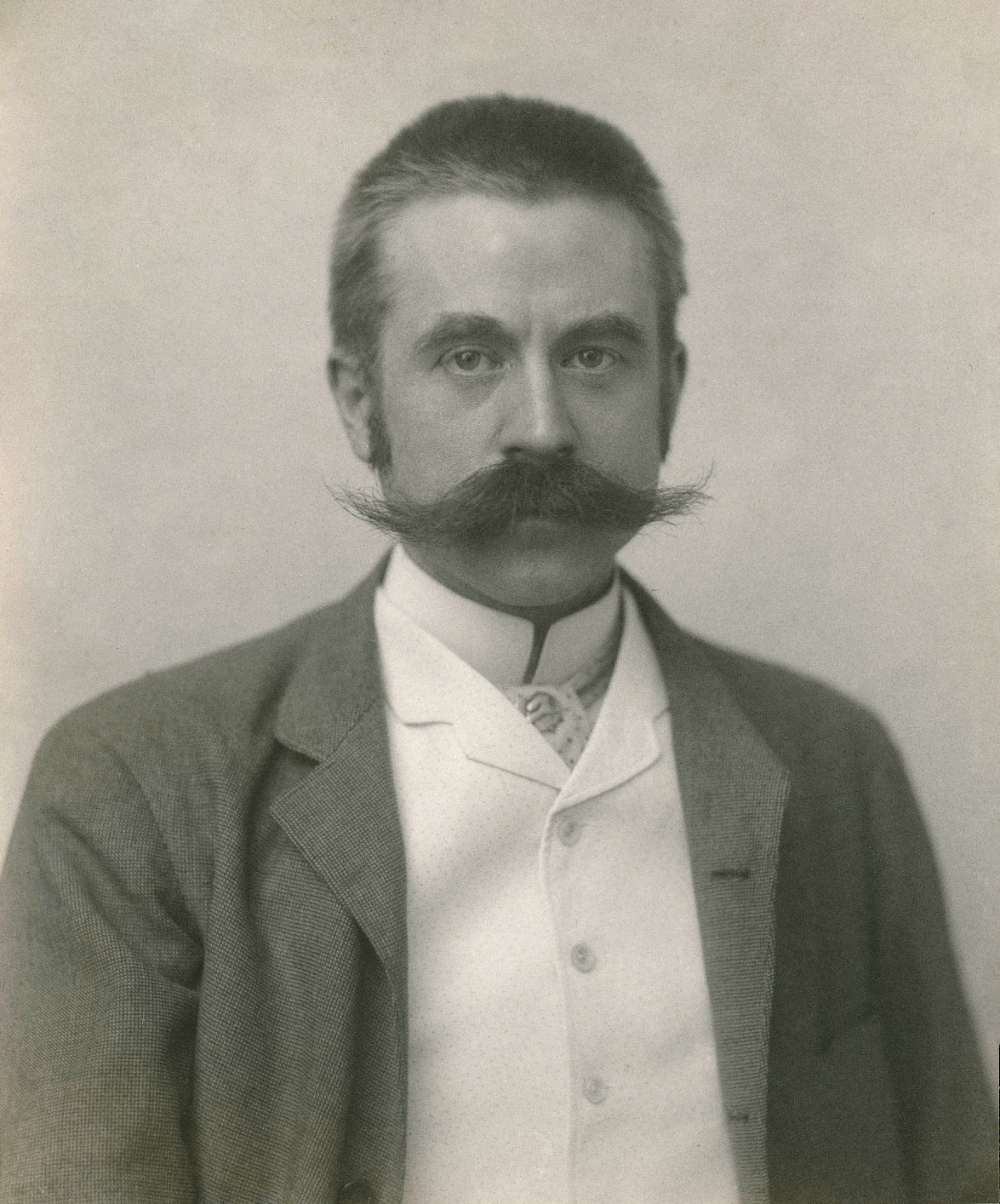
Architect Stanford White

Name	Dates	Nationality	Comments	Reference
Siegfried Wagner	1869–1930	German	Composer; son of Wagner, grandson of Liszt	
Alice Walker	born 1944	American	Author	
Rebecca Walker	born 1969	American	Author and activist	
Yona Wallach	1944–1985	Israeli	Poet	
Wallada bint al-Mustakfi	994–1091	Andalusian	Poet	
Clara Ward	1924–1973	American	Gospel music singer	
Sylvia Townsend Warner	1893–1978	English	Writer	
Ethel Waters	1896–1977	American	Singer and actress	
Evelyn Waugh	1903–1966	English	Writer	
Jann Wenner	born 1946	American	Journalist	
Rosemary West	born 1953	English	Serial killer	
John Brooks Wheelwright	1897–1940	American	Poet	
Mike White	born 1970	American	Writer and actor	
Stanford White	1853–1906	American	Architect	
Archduke Wilhelm of Austria	1895–1948	Austrian	Archduke, soldier, and poet	
Rachel Williams	born 1967	American	Model and TV presenter (The Girlie Show)	
Rozz Williams	1963–1998	American	Musician, original songwriter for Christian Death	
Malcolm Williamson	1931–2003	Australian	Composer, Master of the Queen's Music	
Harris Wofford	1926–2019	American	Politician, senator	
Patrick Wolf	born 1983	English	Musician	
Christopher Wood	1901–1930	English	Painter	
Evan Rachel Wood	born 1987	American	Actress, singer	
Virginia Woolf	1882–1941	English	Writer	
Kate Worley	1958–2004	American	Comic book writer	
Aileen Wuornos	1956–2002	American	Serial killer	

== Y ==
Name	Dates	Nationality	Comments	Reference
Mary Anne Yates	1728–1787	English	Actress	
Nikolai Yezhov	1895–1940	Russian	Senior figure in the NKVD during the period of the Great Purge	
Lola Young	born 2001	English	Singer	
Marguerite Yourcenar	1903–1987	French	Writer	

== Z ==
Name	Dates	Nationality	Comments	Reference
Babe Zaharias	1911–1956	American	Athlete	
Tati Zaqui	born 1994	Brazilian	Singer-songwriter and dancer	
Kim Zolciak	born 1968	American	Singer and cast member of The Real Housewives of Atlanta	
Anna Maria Żukowska	1983	Polish	Politician, jurist	
