= List of bisexual people (G–M) =

List of bisexual people including famous people who identify as bisexual and deceased people who have been identified as bisexual.

== G ==
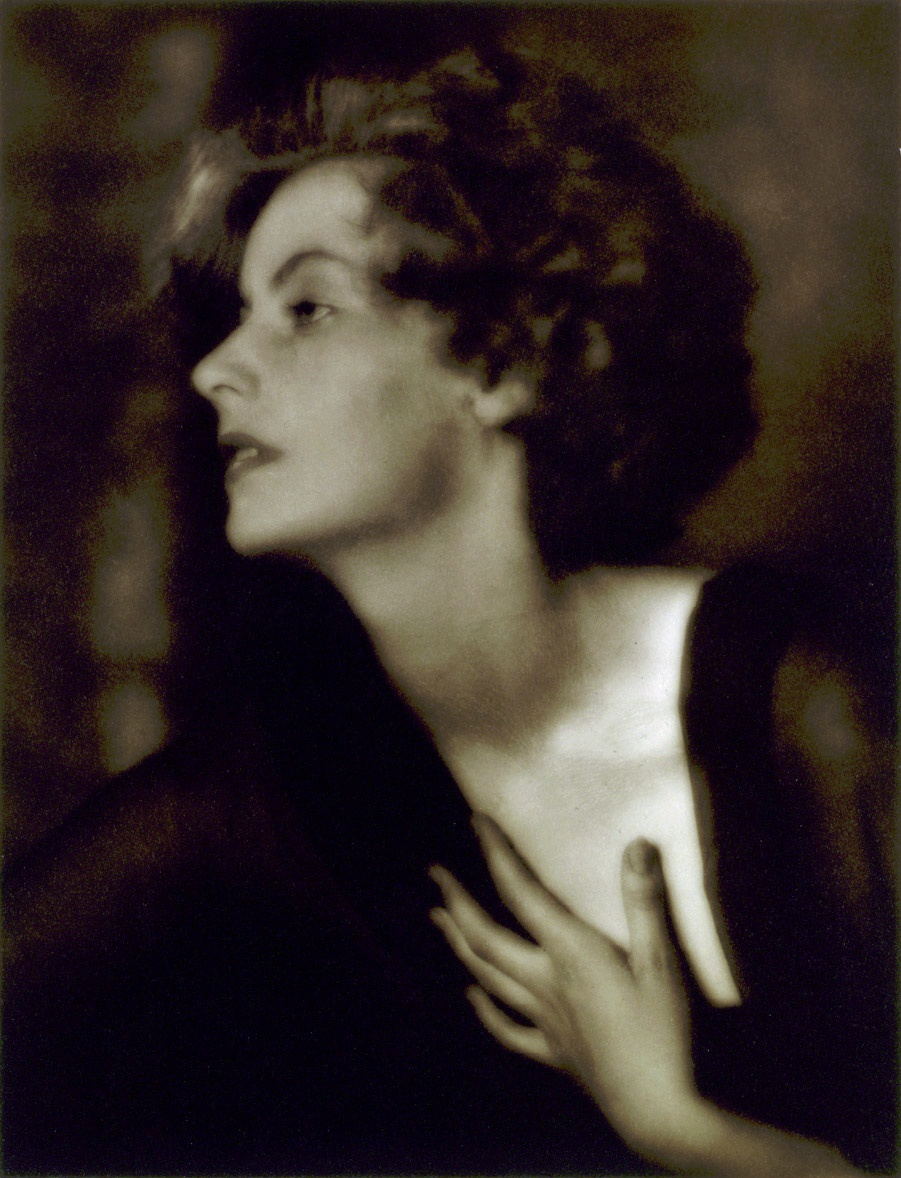
Actress Greta Garbo

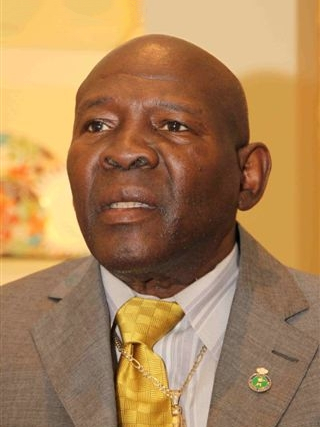
Professional boxer Emile Griffith

Name	Dates	Nationality	Comments	Reference
Vicky Galindo	born 1983	American	Softball player	
Greta Garbo	1905–1990	Swedish	Actress	
Art Garfunkel	born 1941	American	Singer and actor	
Mary Garman	1898–1979	British	Socialite, wife of Roy Campbell, lover of Vita Sackville-West	
Erica Gavin	born 1947	American	Actress in Russ Meyer's Vixen!	
Prince George, Duke of Kent	1902–1942	British	Royalty	
Georgiana Cavendish	1757–1806	British	Duchess of Devonshire	
Thea Gill	born 1970	Canadian	Actress in Queer as Folk. When asked, "Would you say you are bisexual?", she said, "I guess, well I've thought about that a lot. And I guess perhaps I am."	
Jamie Gillis	1943–2010	American	Pornographic actor and director	
John Glassco	1909–1981	Canadian	Poet, memoirist and novelist	
Gloria, Princess of Thurn and Taxis	born 1960	German	Aristocrat and socialite	
Alison Goldfrapp	born 1966	British	Singer	
Beatrice Gomez	born 1995	Filipino	Model and beauty pageant titleholder; Miss Universe Philippines 2021	
Krzysztof Gonciarz	born 1985	Polish	YouTuber, filmmaker, journalist	
Julie Goodyear	born 1942	British	Actress	
Edmund Goulding	1891–1959	English	Film director	
Jessica Graham		American	Actress	
Armand de Gramont, comte de Guiche	1637–1673	French	Nobleman, adventurer and playboy	
Elisabeth de Gramont	1875–1954	French	Writer, lover of Natalie Barney	
Farley Granger	1925–2011	American	Actor, lover of Leonard Bernstein and Patricia Neal	
Cary Grant	1904–1986	British	Actor	
Duncan Grant	1885–1978	British	Painter and member of the Bloomsbury Group	
Eileen Gray	1878–1976	Irish	Architect and furniture designer	
Devin K. Grayson	born 1970	American	Comic book writer	
Jack Dylan Grazer	born 2003	American	Actor	
Hank Green	born 1980	American	Vlogger, science communicator, entrepreneur, author, internet producer, and musician	
Kenny Greene	1969–2001	American	Musician with the R&B group Intro	
Liza Greer	born 1963	American	Model and actress	
Sasha Grey	born 1988	American	Former pornographic actress, now a mainstream actress; also model and musician	
Emile Griffith	1938–2013	American	Boxer	
Larkin Grimm	born 1981	American	Singer-songwriter and musician	
Daniel Guérin	1904–1988	French	Anarchist and author	
Peggy Guggenheim	1898–1979	American	Art collector	
Alec Guinness	1914–2000	British	Actor	

== H ==
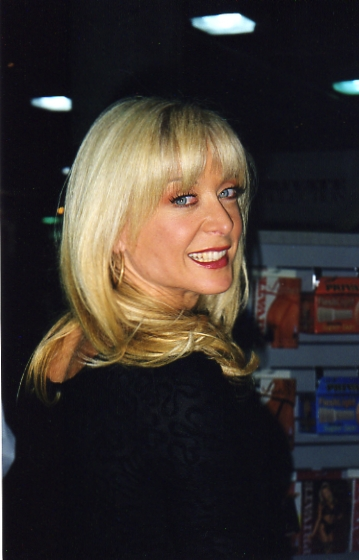
Pornographic actress Nina Hartley

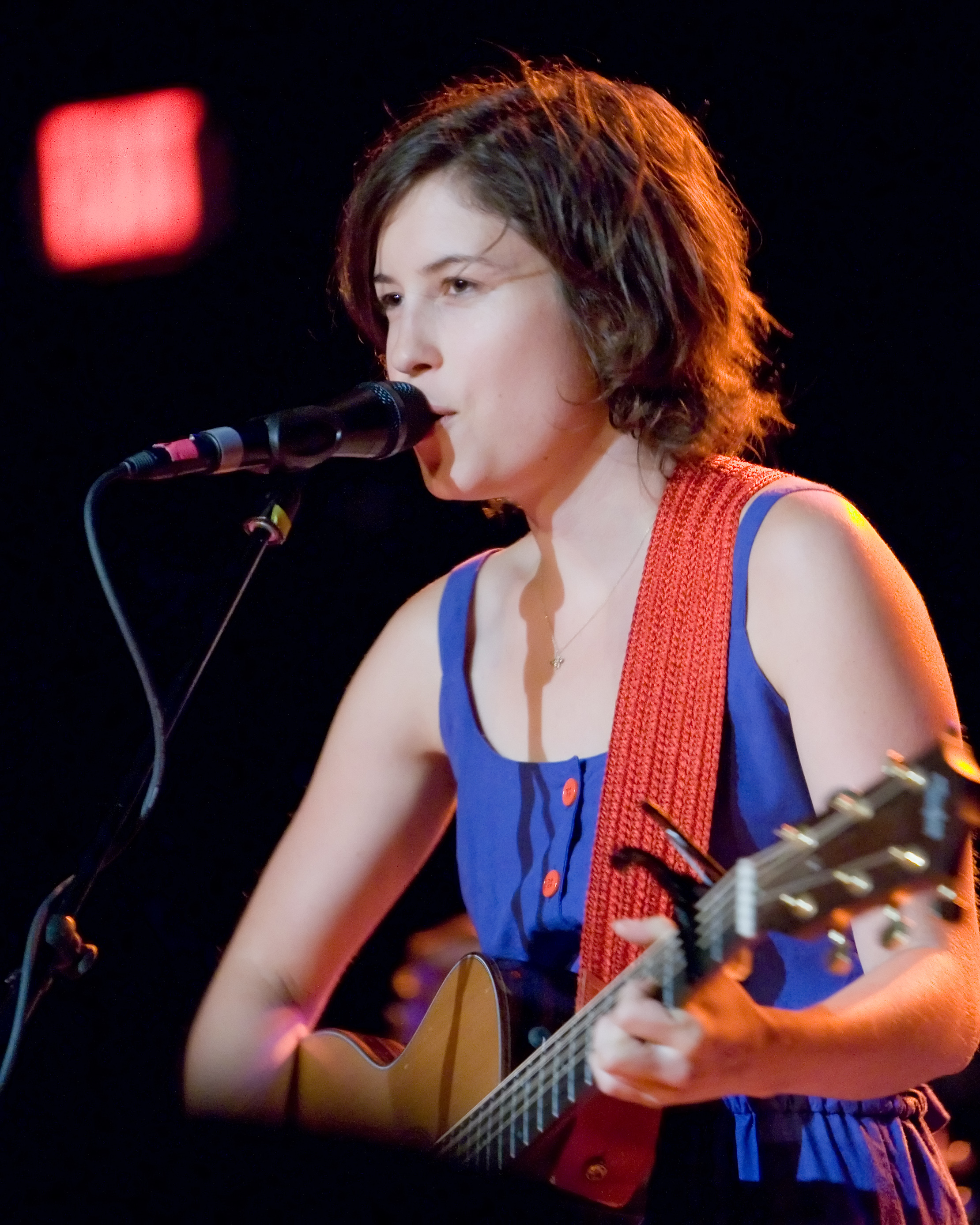
Musician Missy Higgins

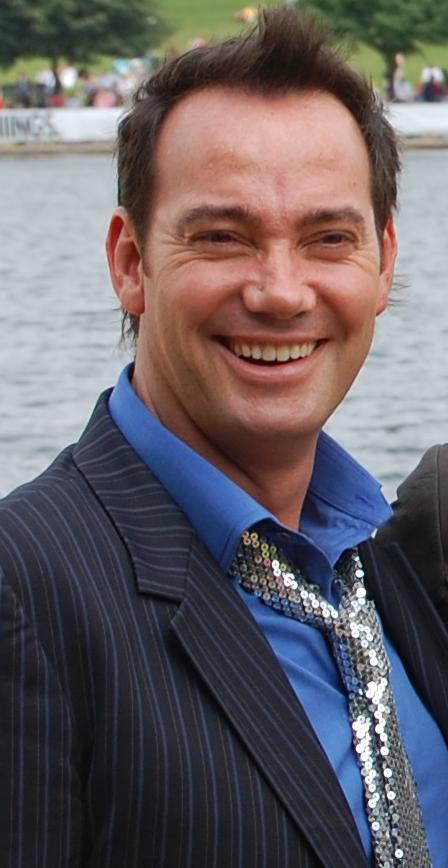
Dancer Craig Revel Horwood

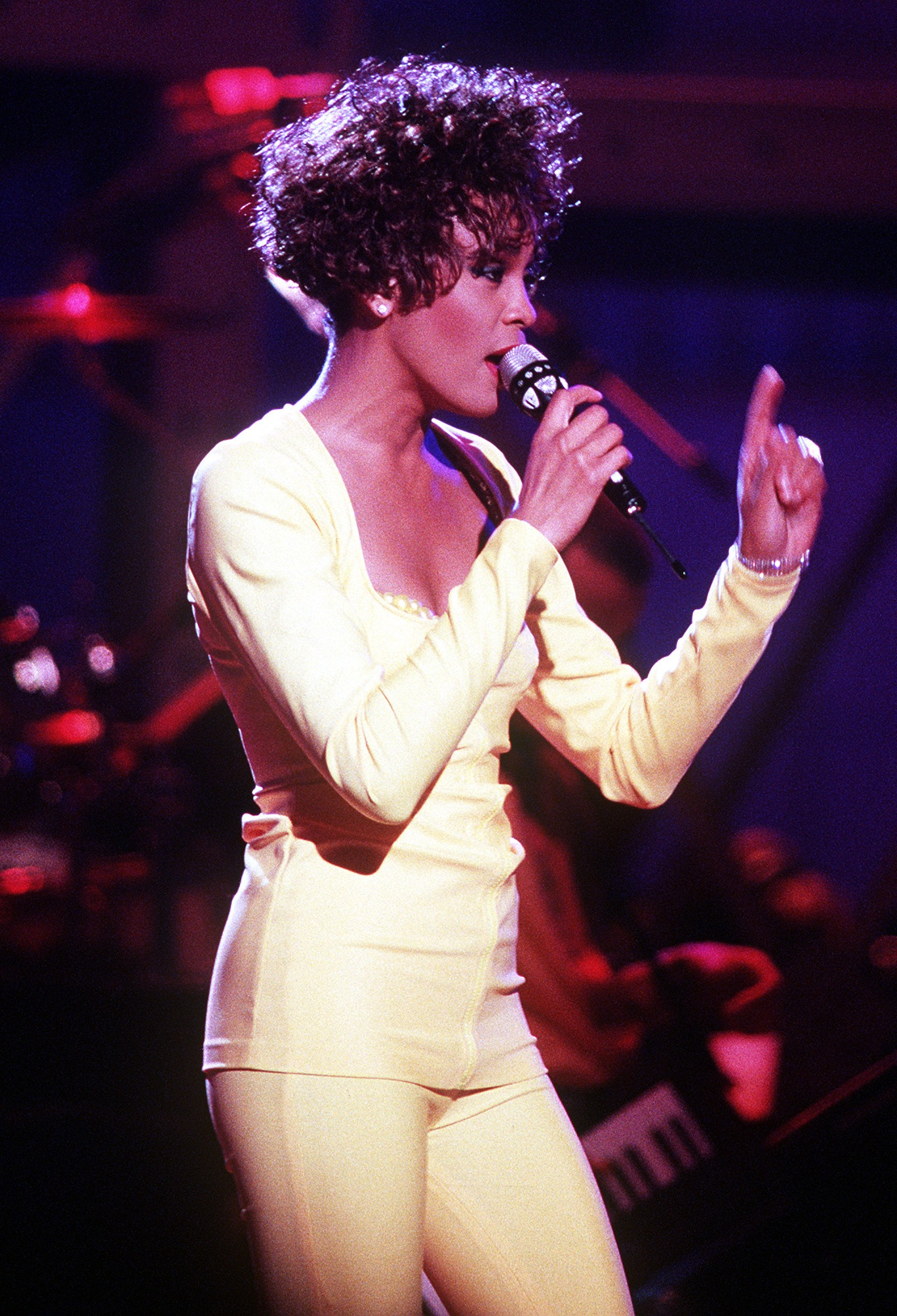
Singer Whitney Houston

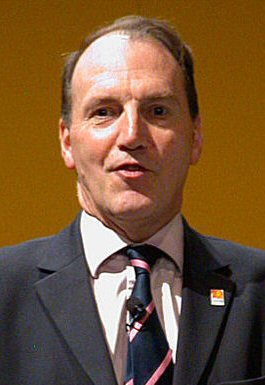
Politician Simon Hughes in 2010

Name	Dates	Nationality	Comments	Reference
H.D.	1886–1961	American	Poet	
Marilyn Hacker	born 1942	American	Poet, married to Samuel R. Delany	
Richard Halliburton	1900–1939	American	Writer	
Emma, Lady Hamilton	1761–1815	British	Mistress of Lord Nelson	
Kathleen Hanna	born 1968	American	Musician	
Darlene Hard	1936–2021	American	Tennis player	
Lesbia Harford	1891–1927	Australian	Poet, novelist and political activist	
Carmen Hart	born 1984	American	Former pornographic actress and erotic dancer	
Veronica Hart	born 1956	American	Former pornographic actress and adult model; now a director and producer, and occasionally a mainstream actress	
Nina Hartley	born 1959	American	Pornographic actress, pornographic film director, sex educator, author, and feminist	
Patrick Harvie	born 1973	British	Scottish Green Party co-leader 2008–	
Beatrice Hastings	1879–1943	British	Writer, poet and literary critic; lover of Katherine Mansfield and Wyndham Lewis	
Annette Haven	born 1954	American	Former pornographic actress and erotic dancer	
Sophie B. Hawkins	born 1967	American	Musician	
Nathaniel Hawthorne	1804–1864	American	Writer	
Jenna Haze	born 1982	American	Pornographic actress, director, and businesswoman	
Hedwig Elizabeth Charlotte	1759–1818	Swedish	Queen-consort of Charles XIII of Sweden, also a famed diarist, memoir-writer and wit	
Nona Hendryx	born 1944	American	Singer, solo and with Labelle	
William A. Henry III	1950–1994	American	Writer and critic	
Katharine Hepburn	1907–2003	American	Actress, said by her biographer Darwin Porter to have had affairs with Greta Garbo, Judy Holliday and Judy Garland	
Josephine Herbst	1892–1969	American	Novelist	
Billy Herrington	1969–2018	American	Pornographic and mainstream film actor	
John Hervey, 2nd Baron Hervey	1696–1743	English/British	Courtier and political writer	
Prince Philipp of Hesse	1896–1980	German	Nazi governor of Hesse-Kassel and interior designer	
Missy Higgins	born 1983	Australian	Singer; "I fall most easily under the category 'Bisexual'."	
Christopher Hitchens	1949–2011	American/British	British-born journalist and writer	
Hannah Höch	1889–1978	German	Artist	
Frances Hodgkins	1869–1947	New Zealand	Artist	
Judy Holliday	1921–1965	American	Actress	
Laurel Holloman	born 1971	American	Actress; "I always consider myself bisexual."'	
Libby Holman	1904–1971	American	Torch singer	
A.M. Homes	born 1961	American	Writer	
Sebastian Horsley	1962–2010	British	Artist	
Craig Revel Horwood	born 1965	Australian	Choreographer, dancer	
Whitney Houston	1963–2012	American	Singer and actress	
Brenda Howard	1946–2005	American	Bisexual activist	
Magdalen Hsu-Li	born 1970	Canadian	Musician	
Simon Hughes	born 1951	British	Liberal Democrat politician	
Mia Hundvin	born 1977	Norwegian	Professional handball player	
Heather Hunter	born 1969	American	Former pornographic actress and adult model; now a painter, novelist, and musician	
Loraine Hutchins		American	Writer and activist	
Josephine Hutchinson	1903–1998	American	Actress	
Hung Huynh		American	Vietnamese-born chef; won Top Chef series three	
Phyllis Hyman	1949–1995	American	Musician	
Trina Schart Hyman	1939–2004	American	Artist	

== I ==
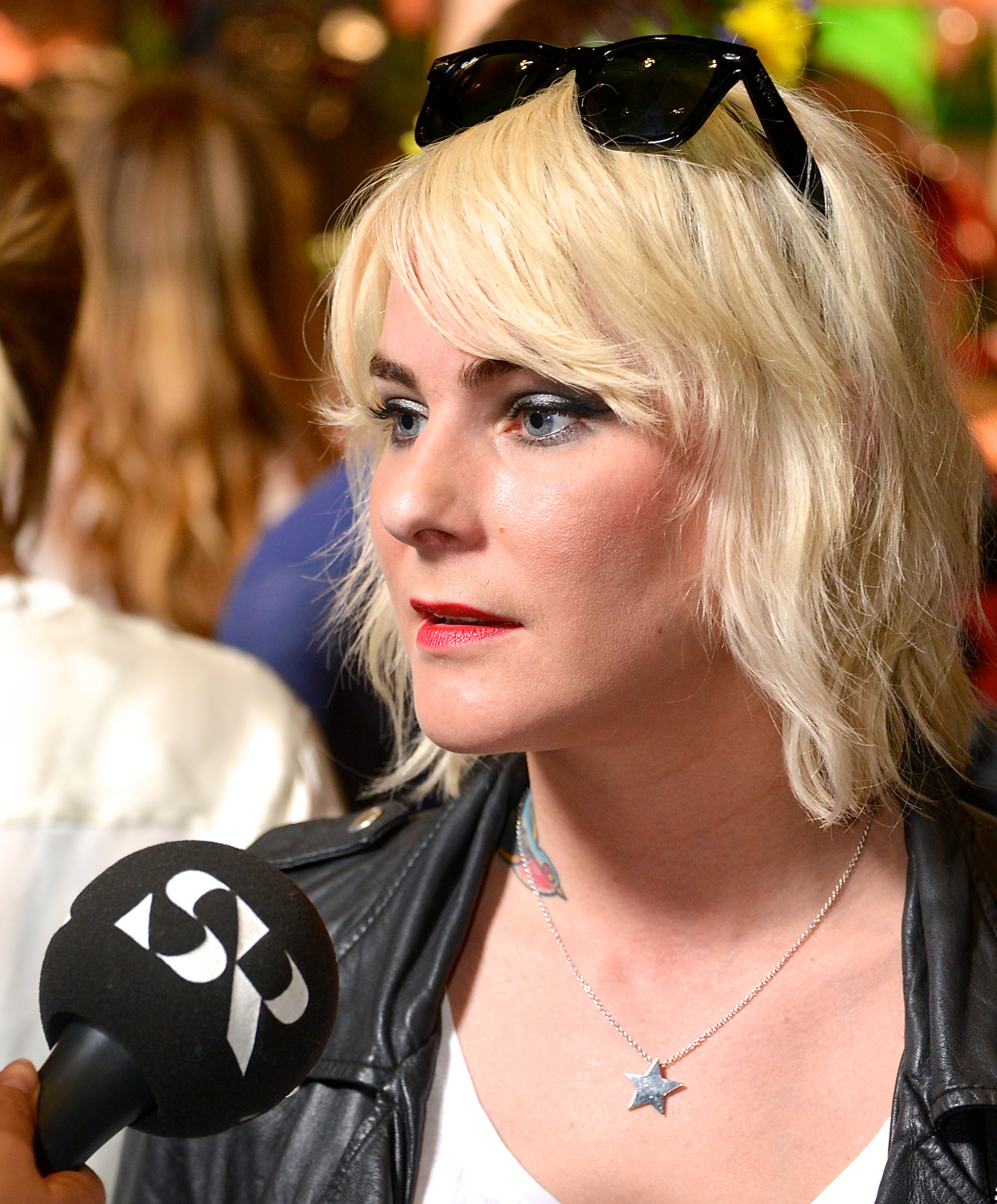
Singer Maja Ivarsson in 2013

Name	Dates	Nationality	Comments	Reference
Ice Spice	born 2000	American	Rapper	
Kylie Ireland	born 1970	American	Pornographic actress and blogger	
Patricia Ireland	born 1945	American	Feminist, former president of NOW	
Elina Ivanova		American (born in Ukraine)	Contestant on America's Next Top Model Cycle 11	
Maja Ivarsson	born 1979	Swedish	Musician, lead singer with The Sounds	

== J ==
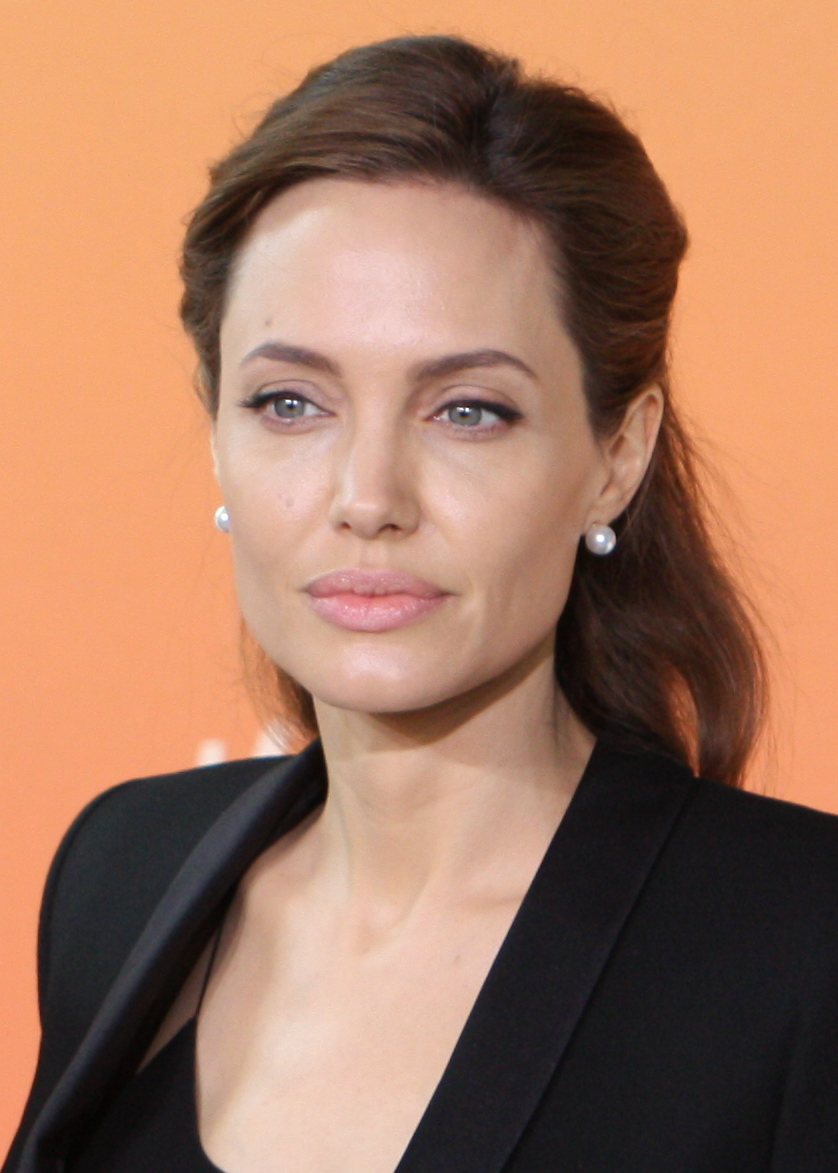
Actress Angelina Jolie

Name	Dates	Nationality	Comments	Reference
Derek Jackson	1906–1982	British	Physicist	
Felix Jaehn	born 1994	German	DJ	
Jesse Jane	1980–2024	American	Pornographic actress and adult model	
Lauren Jauregui	born 1996	American	Singer with girl group Fifth Harmony	
Jessicka	born 1975	American	Artist, musician with Jack Off Jill, Scarling.	
Johannes, Prince von Thurn and Taxis	1926–1990	German	Aristocrat	
Gwen John	1876–1939	British	Artist	
JoJo	1990	American	Singer; stated that she is "into [having threesomes with women]"	
Angelina Jolie	born 1975	American	Actress; when Barbara Walters asked her if she was bisexual, Jolie responded: 'Of course.'	
Grace Jones	born 1948	American	Model and musician	
Janis Joplin	1943–1970	American	Musician	
June Jordan	1936–2002	American	Poet and author	
Orlando Jordan	born 1971	American	Professional wrestler	
Miranda July	born 1974	American	Performance artist and filmmaker	
Sondre Justad	born 1990	Norwegian	Musician and songwriter	
Patrick Juvet	1950–2021	Swiss	Model and singer	

== K ==
Name	Dates	Nationality	Comments	Reference
Lani Ka'ahumanu	born 1943	American	Writer and activist	
Frida Kahlo	1907–1954	Mexican	Painter	
Florina Kaja	born 1982	American	Reality television participant, actress, singer, and activist	
Candye Kane	born 1965	American	Singer and former pornographic actress	
Pat Kavanagh	1940–2008	British	Literary agent, wife of writer Julian Barnes, lover of Jeanette Winterson	
Danny Kaye	1911–1987	American	Actor and musician	
Micah Kellner	born 1978	American	Politician	
Jill Kelly	born 1971	American	Pornographic actress, director, and producer	
Florence King	1936–2016	American	Writer and misanthrope	
Alfred Kinsey	1894–1956	American	Biologist and human sexuality research scientist	
James Kirkup	1918–2009	British	Poet, translator and travel writer	
Calvin Klein	born 1942	American	Fashion designer	
Oswalt Kolle	1928–2010	German/Dutch	Sexologist	
Ronnie Kray	1933–2000	British	Criminal	

== L ==
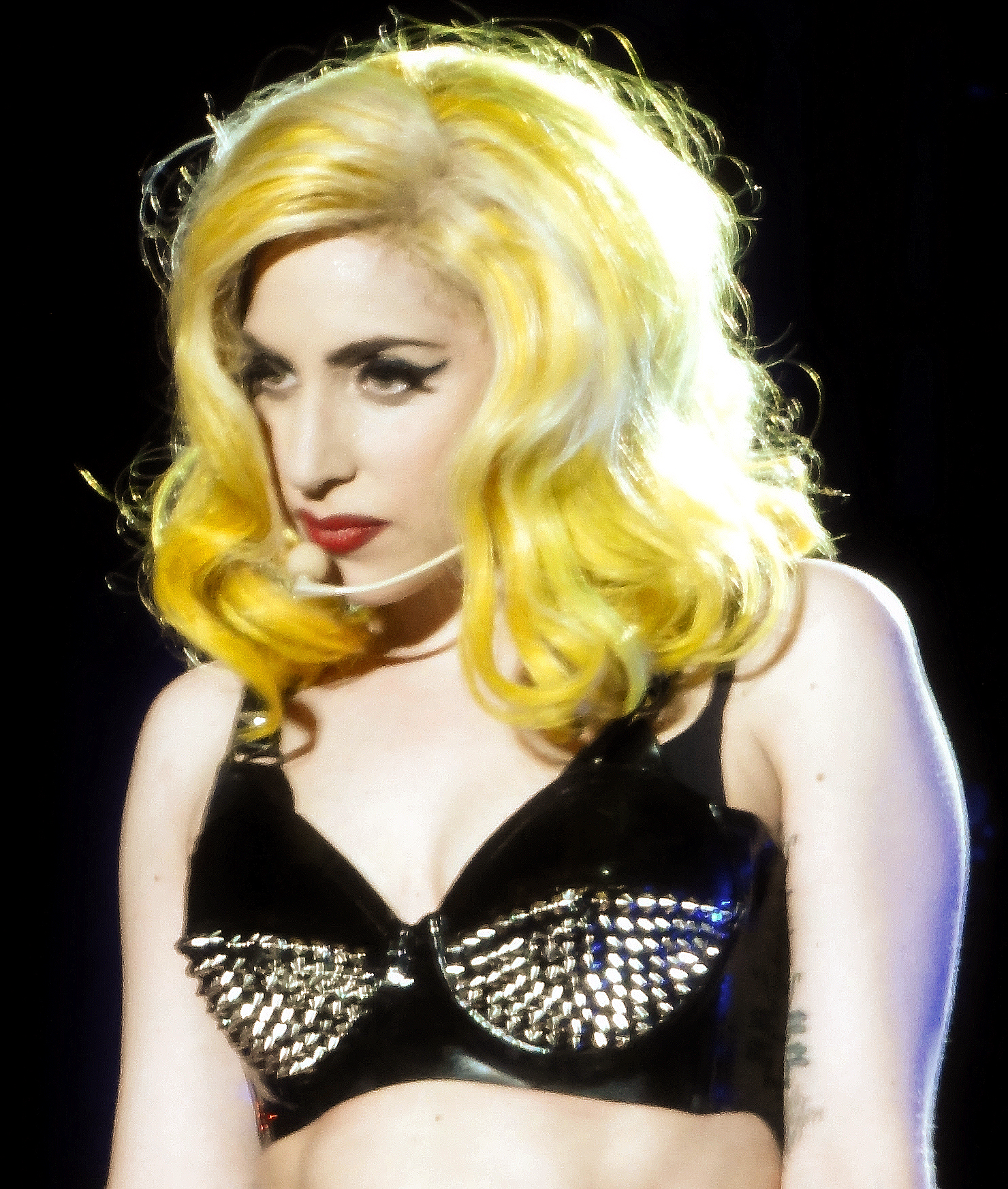
Musician Lady Gaga

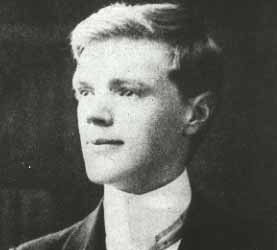
Writer D.H. Lawrence

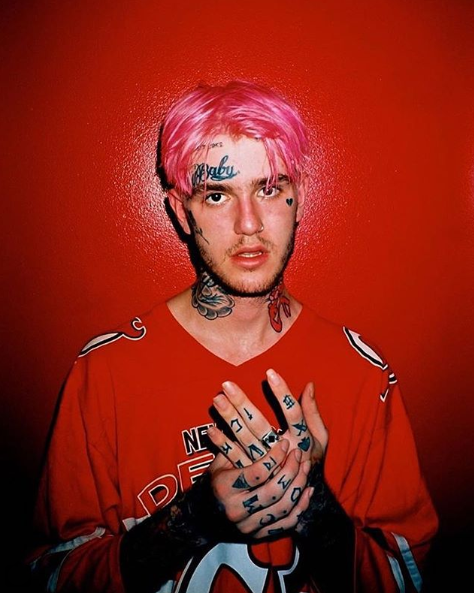
Rapper, singer, and songwriter, Lil Peep in 2016

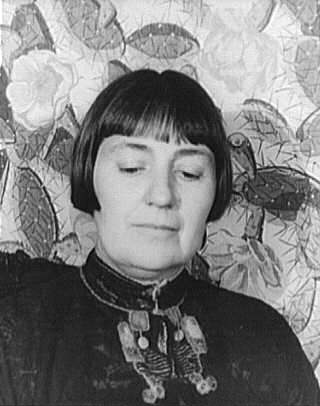
Arts patron Mabel Dodge Luhan

Name	Dates	Nationality	Comments	Reference
Christian Lacroix	born 1951	French	Fashion designer; "I've always been bisexual."	
Lady Gaga	born 1986	American	Musician; her single "Poker Face" is about dealing with the experiences of being bisexual.	
Sheela Lambert	born 1956	American	Writer and activist	
Adrian Lamo	1981–2018	American	Hacker, journalist, writer	
Burt Lancaster	1913–1994	American	Actor	
Carole Landis	1919–1948	American	Actress; had a relationship with Jacqueline Susann	
Devinn Lane	born 1972	American	Former pornographic actress and adult model; now a pornographic film director and producer	
Sunny Lane	born 1980	American	Pornographic actress and adult model	
Françoise de Langlade	1920–1983	French	Editor of French Vogue, wife of Oscar de la Renta	
Storm Large	born 1969	American	Musician, Rock Star: Supernova contestant	
Nella Larsen	1891–1964	American	Writer	
Charles Laughton	1899–1962	British	Actor	
Dyanna Lauren	born 1965	American	Pornographic actress, erotic dancer, singer, businesswoman, and director	
Duncan Laurence	born 1994	Dutch	Singer, winner of Eurovision Song Contest 2019	
Marie Laurencin	1883–1956	French	Artist	
Héctor Lavoe	1946–1993	Puerto Rican	Salsa singer	
D. H. Lawrence	1885–1930	British	Writer	
Gertrude Lawrence	1898–1952	British	Actress and singer	
Georgette Leblanc	1875–1941	French	Singer	
Violette Leduc	1907–1972	French	Writer	
James Lees-Milne	1908–1997	British	Architectural historian, preservationist, diarist	
Carol Leigh	born 1951	American	Artist, author, film maker, and sex workers' rights activist	
Julia Lemigova	born 1973	Russian	Former Miss USSR, partner of Martina Navratilova	
Tamara de Lempicka	1898–1980	Polish	Polish-born artist	
Anne Lennard, Countess of Sussex	1661–1721	English	Aristocrat	
Alan Lennox-Boyd	1904–1983	British	Conservative politician	
Sunny Leone	born 1981	Canadian/American	Pornographic and mainstream film actress, adult model, businesswoman	
Lil Peep	1996–2017	American	Rapper	
Beatrice Lillie	1894–1989	Canadian	Actress, singer and comedian	
Iyari Limon	born 1976	Mexican	American actress	
Maggie Lindemann	born 1998	American	Singer-songwriter	
Bai Ling	born 1970	American	Actress	
Roddy Llewellyn	born 1947	British	Gardener, author, former lover of Princess Margaret	
Kristanna Loken	born 1979	American/Norwegian	Actress; "I'm confident with who I am and being openly bisexual."	
Joe Longthorne	born 1955	British	Singer, vocal impersonator	
Rebecca Loos	born 1977	Dutch	Media personality; former PA of David Beckham	
Loreen	born 1983	Swedish	Singer and songwriter	
Mabel Dodge Luhan	1879–1963	American	Arts patron	
Mariette Lydis	1887–1970	Austrian-Argentine	Artist	

== M ==
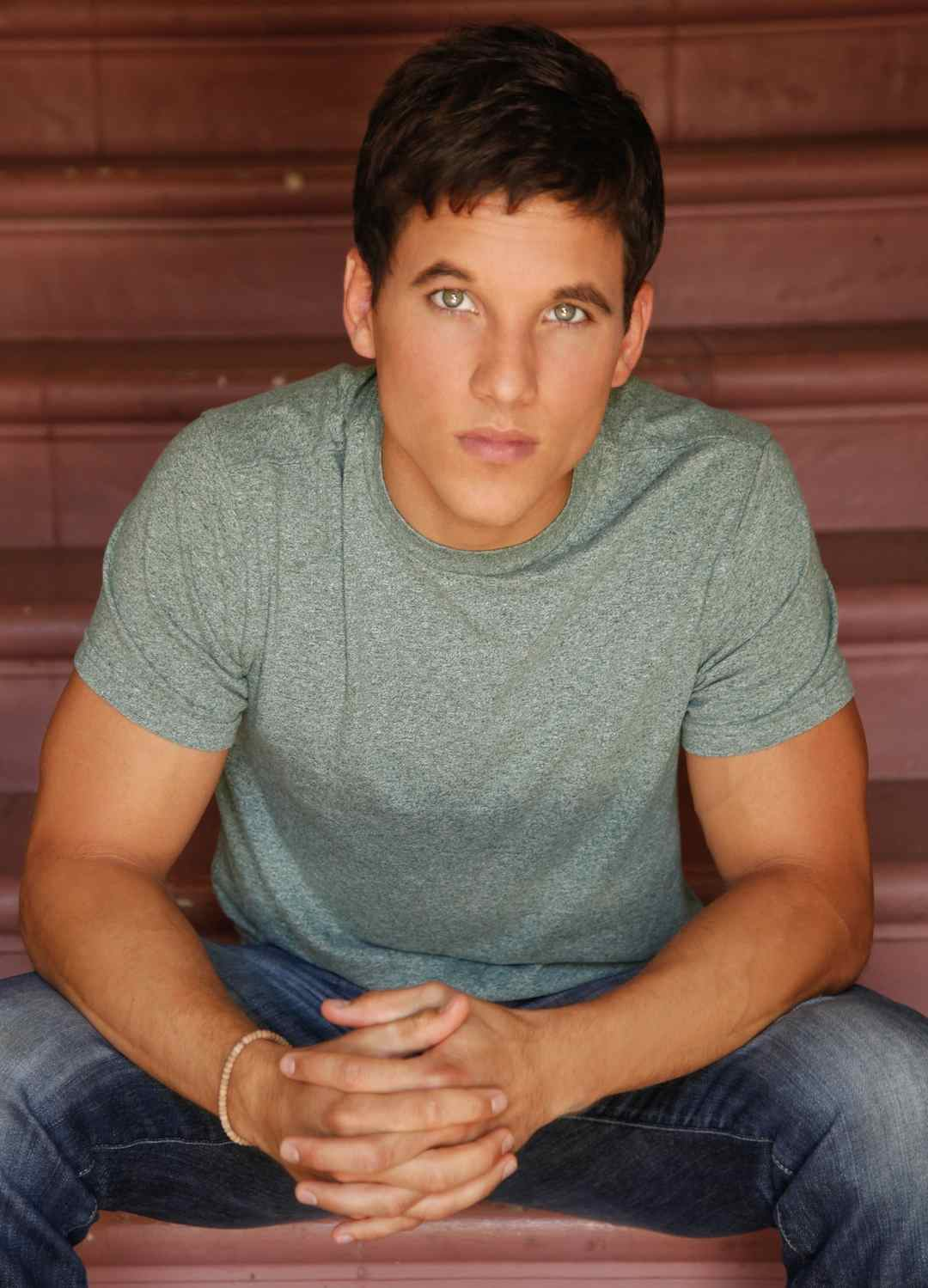
Actor Mike Manning in 2013

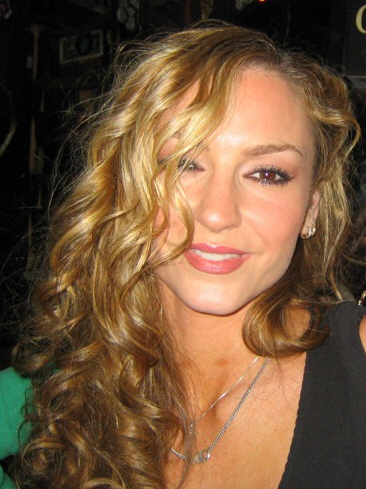
Actress Drea de Matteo

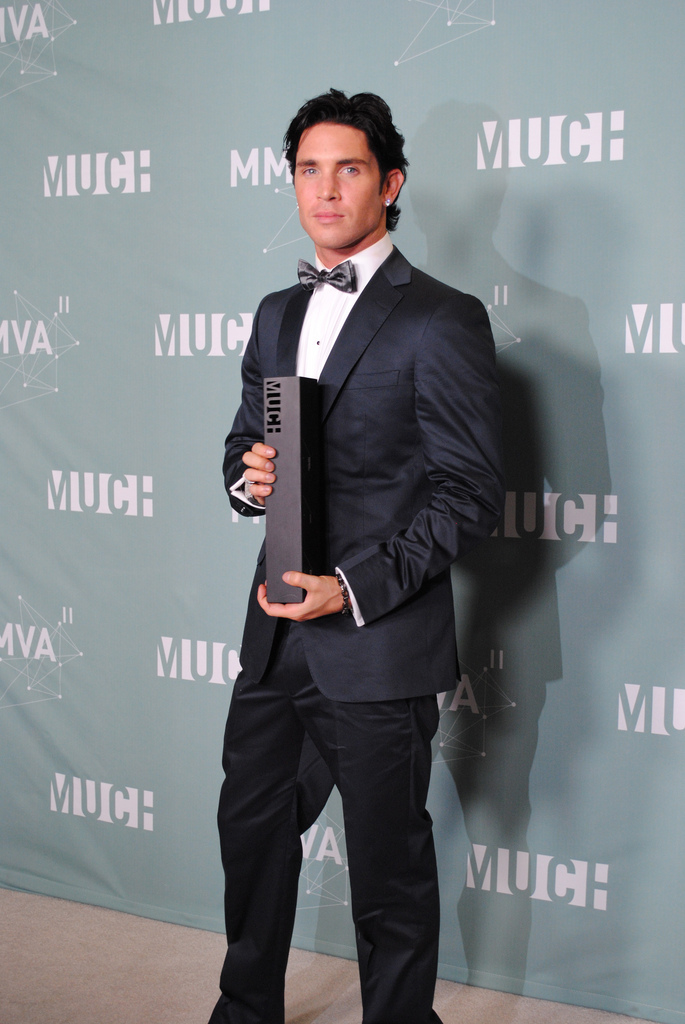
Dancer, pop singer and choreographer Blake McGrath in 2011

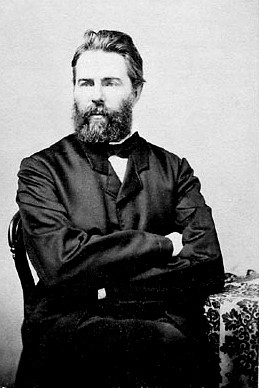
Author Herman Melville

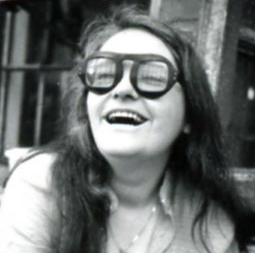
Feminist author Kate Millett

Name	Dates	Nationality	Comments	Reference
Colin MacInnes	1914–1976	British	Writer and journalist	
Mary MacLane	1881–1929	Canadian	Writer	
Donald Maclean	1913–1983	English	Diplomat and spy	
Maria Maggenti	born 1962	American	Film and screen director	
Anna Malle	1967-2006	American	Pornographic actress and director	
Leslie Mancia	born 1988	American	Contestant on America's Next Top Model	
Hortense Mancini	1646–1699	French	Mistress of Charles II of England	
Mike Manning	born 1987	American	Actor and activist	
Katherine Mansfield	1888–1923	New Zealand	Writer	
Sarah, Duchess of Marlborough	1660–1744	English	Courtier, rumored to be lover of Queen Anne	
Melanie Martinez	born 1995	American	Singer-songwriter	
Lebo Mathosa	1977–2006	South African	Kwaito singer	
Drea de Matteo	born 1972	American	Actress (The Sopranos and Joey)	
Alison Mau	born 1965	New Zealander	Television journalist and presenter; "Yes, I'm bisexual."	
Gavin Maxwell	1914–1969	Scottish	Naturalist and writer; author of Ring of Bright Water	
Jenn McAllister	born 1996	American	YouTuber and actress	
Robert McAlmon	1896–1956	American	Writer and publisher	
Carson McCullers	1917–1967	American	Writer	
Blake McGrath	born 1983	Canadian	Dancer, pop singer and choreographer	
Elijah McKenzie-Jackson	born 2003	British	Artist and author	
Les McKeown	1955–2021	Scottish	Musician; lead singer of the Bay City Rollers	
Carmen McRae	1920–1994	American	Jazz singer	
Margaret Mead	1901–1978	American	Anthropologist and writer	
Duchess of Medina Sidonia	1936–2008	Spanish	Her Excellency Doña Luisa Isabel Álvarez de Toledo y Maura, 21st Duchess of Medina-Sidonia	
George Melly	1926–2007	English	Jazz and blues singer	
Herman Melville	1819–1891	American	Writer	
Jillian Michaels	born 1974	American	Personal trainer, appeared on The Biggest Loser	
Edna St. Vincent Millay	1892–1950	American	Poet, playwright	
June Miller	1902–1979	American	Wife of Henry Miller, lover of Anaïs Nin	
Marilyn Miller	1898–1936	American	Musical star	
Kate Millett	1934–2017	American	Feminist and writer	
Mary Millington	1945–1979	English	Model and pornographic actress	
Sal Mineo	1939–1976	American	Actor, portrayed Plato in Rebel Without a Cause	
Vincente Minnelli	1903–1986	American	Film and stage director, father of Liza Minnelli	
Pamela Mitford	1907–1994	English	One of the Mitford Sisters	
Thomas Mitford	1909–1945	English	Brother of the Mitford Sisters	
Frédéric Mitterrand	born 1947	French	Minister of Culture and Communication (2009–)	
Mary Anne Mohanraj	born 1971	American	Writer, editor, and academic of Sri-Lankan descent	
Jeff Molina	born 1997	American	Mixed martial artist	
Brian Molko	born 1972	Scottish-American	Singer of rock band Placebo	
Erica and Victoria Mongeon		American	Models, stars of A Double Shot at Love	
Lord Montagu of Beaulieu	born 1926	English	Politician and motor museum owner	
Lady Mary Wortley Montagu	1689–1762	English	Writer	
The Right Reverend Paul Moore, Jr.	1919–2003	American	Clergyman; 13th bishop of New York	
Lady Ottoline Morrell	1873–1938	English	Aristocrat and society hostess	
Lord Louis Mountbatten	1900–1979	British	Admiral; uncle of Prince Philip and last Viceroy of India	
Edwina Mountbatten	1901–1960	English	Heiress, socialite, relief-worker, wife of Lord Louis	
Jason Mraz	born 1977	American	Singer-songwriter	
Megan Mullally	born 1958	American	Actress, Will & Grace	
Misty Mundae	born 1979	American	Actress	
Doris Muramatsu		American	Girlyman band member	
Iris Murdoch	1919–1999	Irish	Writer, academic, and philosopher	
Dwina Murphy	born 1949		Artist, wife of Bee Gee Robin Gibb, a "bisexual druid"	
Billie Myers	born 1971	English	Singer-songwriter	
Tiffany Mynx	born 1971	American	Pornographic actress, director, and producer	
