= Mayoral elections in Salt Lake City =

Mayoral elections are currently regularly held in Salt Lake City, Utah, every four years to elect the city's mayor.

== 1995 ==
1995 Salt Lake City mayoral election
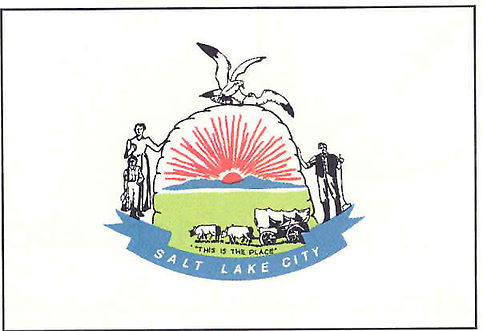
← 1991	4 October and 7 November 1995	1999 →
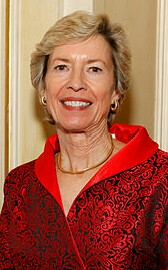

Nominee	Deedee Corradini	Rich McKeown
Party	Nonpartisan	Nonpartisan
Popular vote	21,353	20,826
Percentage	50.63%	49.37%
Mayor before election
Deedee Corradini
Democratic
Elected mayor
Deedee Corradini
Democratic

The 1995 Salt Lake City mayoral election was held between 4 October and 7 November 1995 in order to elect the Mayor of Salt Lake City. Incumbent Mayor Deedee Corradini won re-election against her foremost opponent and fellow Nonpartisan candidate Rich McKeown.

=== Primary election ===
The Nonpartisan primary election was held on 4 October 1995 and saw Rich McKeown and incumbent mayor Deedee Corradini advance towards a run-off.

1995 Salt Lake City mayoral primary election
Candidate	Votes	%
Rich McKeown	7,452	37.35
Deedee Corradini	6,414	32.15
Stephen Harmsen	5,262	26.37
Donald R. Green	291	1.46
Nelson González	232	1.16
Ken Larsen	152	0.76
Frank Joseph Irish	75	0.38
Lawrence Rey "Larry" Topham	74	0.37
Total votes	19,945	100

=== General election ===
The general election was held on 7 November 1995. Incumbent mayor Deedee Corradini won re-election by a margin of 527 votes against her run-off opponent and fellow Nonpartisan candidate Rich McKeown, thereby retaining Democratic control over the office of Mayor of Salt Lake City, Utah.

Salt Lake City mayoral election, 1995
Party	Candidate	Votes	%
Nonpartisanism	Deedee Corradini (incumbent)	21,353	50.63
Nonpartisanism	Rich McKeown	20,826	49.37
Total votes		42,179	100.00
Democratic hold			

== 1999 ==
1999 Salt Lake City mayoral election
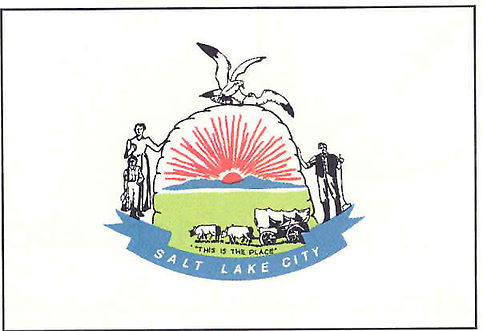
← 1995	November 2, 1999	2003 →
- Turnout: 36.29%
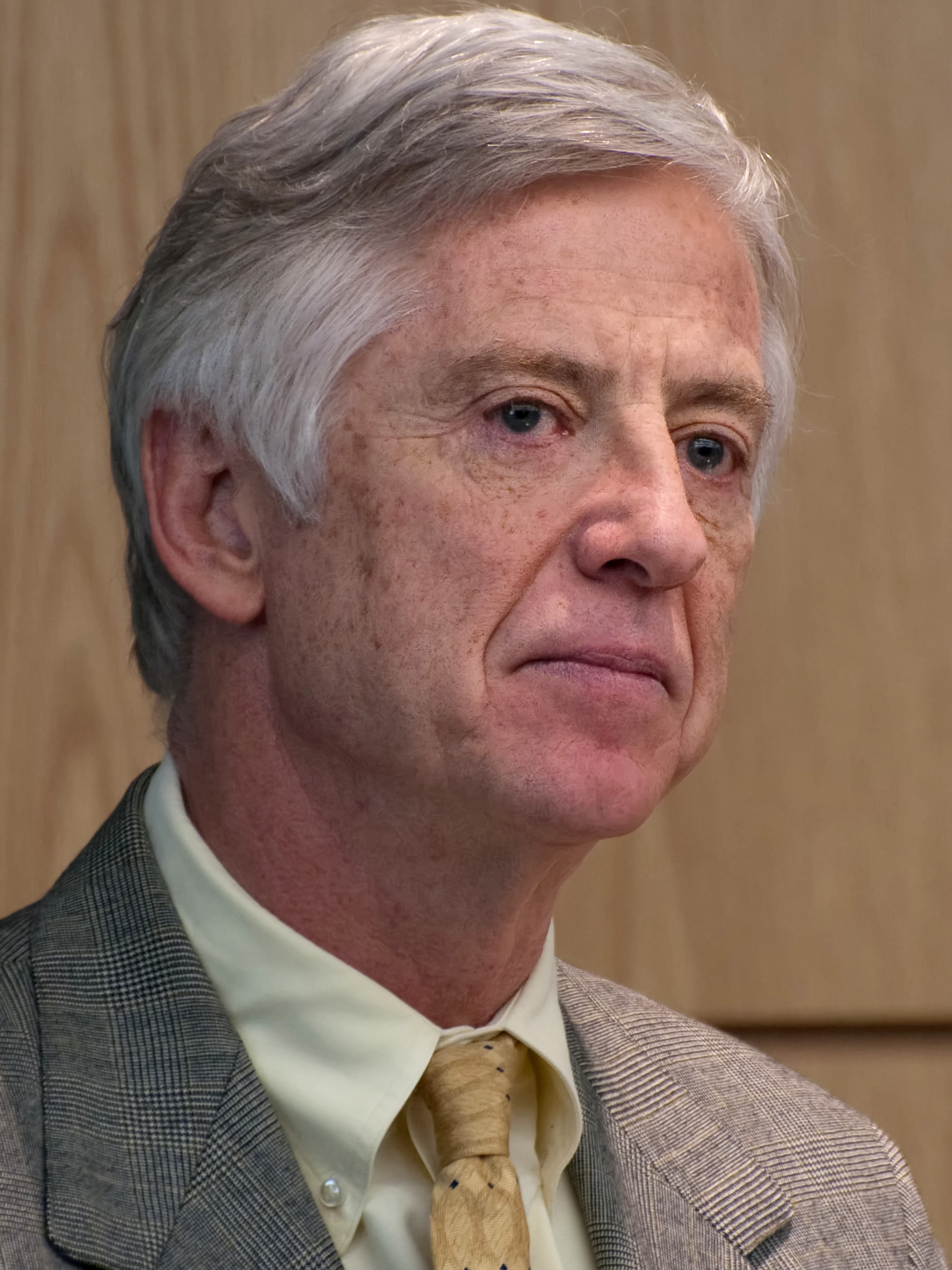

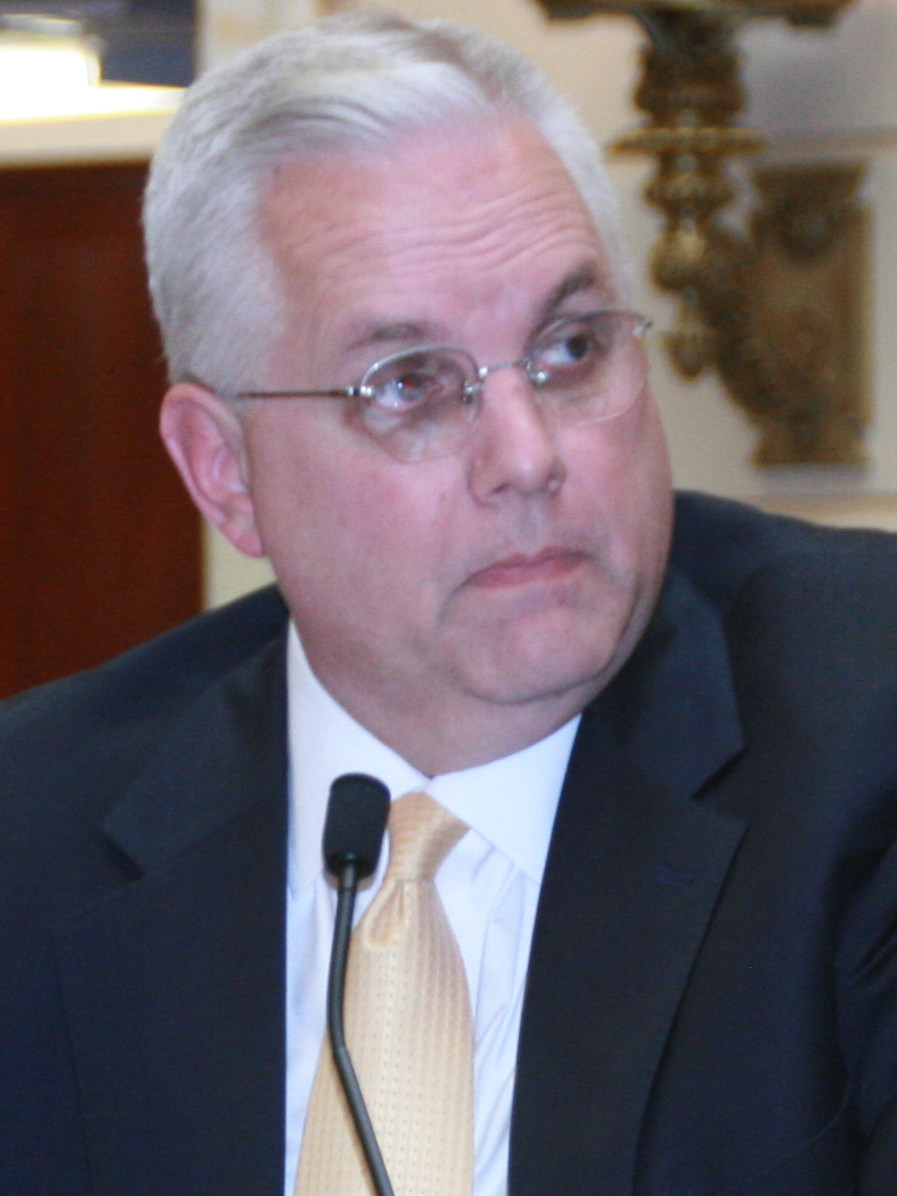
Candidate	Rocky Anderson	Stuart Reid
Party	Nonpartisan	Nonpartisan
Popular vote	24,262	15,961
Percentage	60.32%	39.68%
Mayor before election
Deedee Corradini
Democratic
Elected mayor
Rocky Anderson
Democratic

The 1999 Salt Lake City mayoral election was held on November 2, 1999, to elect the Mayor of Salt Lake City, Utah. It saw the election of Rocky Anderson.

Incumbent mayor Deedee Corradini did not seek reelection.

=== Primary election ===
The nonpartisan primary election was held on October 7?, 1999.

1999 Salt Lake City mayoral primary election
Candidate	Votes	%
Ross "Rocky" Anderson	6,115	23.17
Stuart Reid	5,139	19.47
Dave Jones	5,111	19.36
Jim Bradley	4,665	17.67
Steve Harmsen	3,670	13.90
Mark Zuhl	925	3.50
Mark E. Anderson	294	1.11
John M. Renteria	194	0.73
Niko M. Linardakis	139	0.53
Ken Larsen	118	0.45
Lawrence Rey Topham	27	0.10
Total votes	26,397	100
Voter turnout	36.29%	

=== General election ===
1999 Salt Lake City mayoral election
Candidate	Votes	%
Ross "Rocky" Anderson	24,262	60.32
Stuart Reid	15,961	39.68
Total votes	40,223	100
Voter turnout	47.95%	

== 2003 ==
2003 Salt Lake City mayoral election
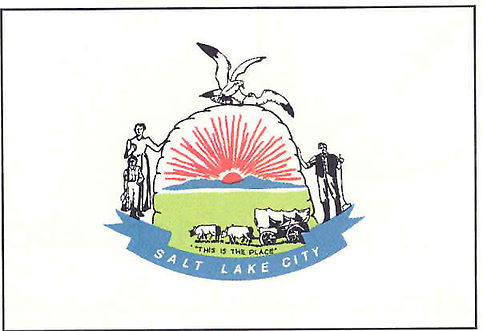
← 1999	November 4, 2003	2007 →
- Turnout: 47.94%
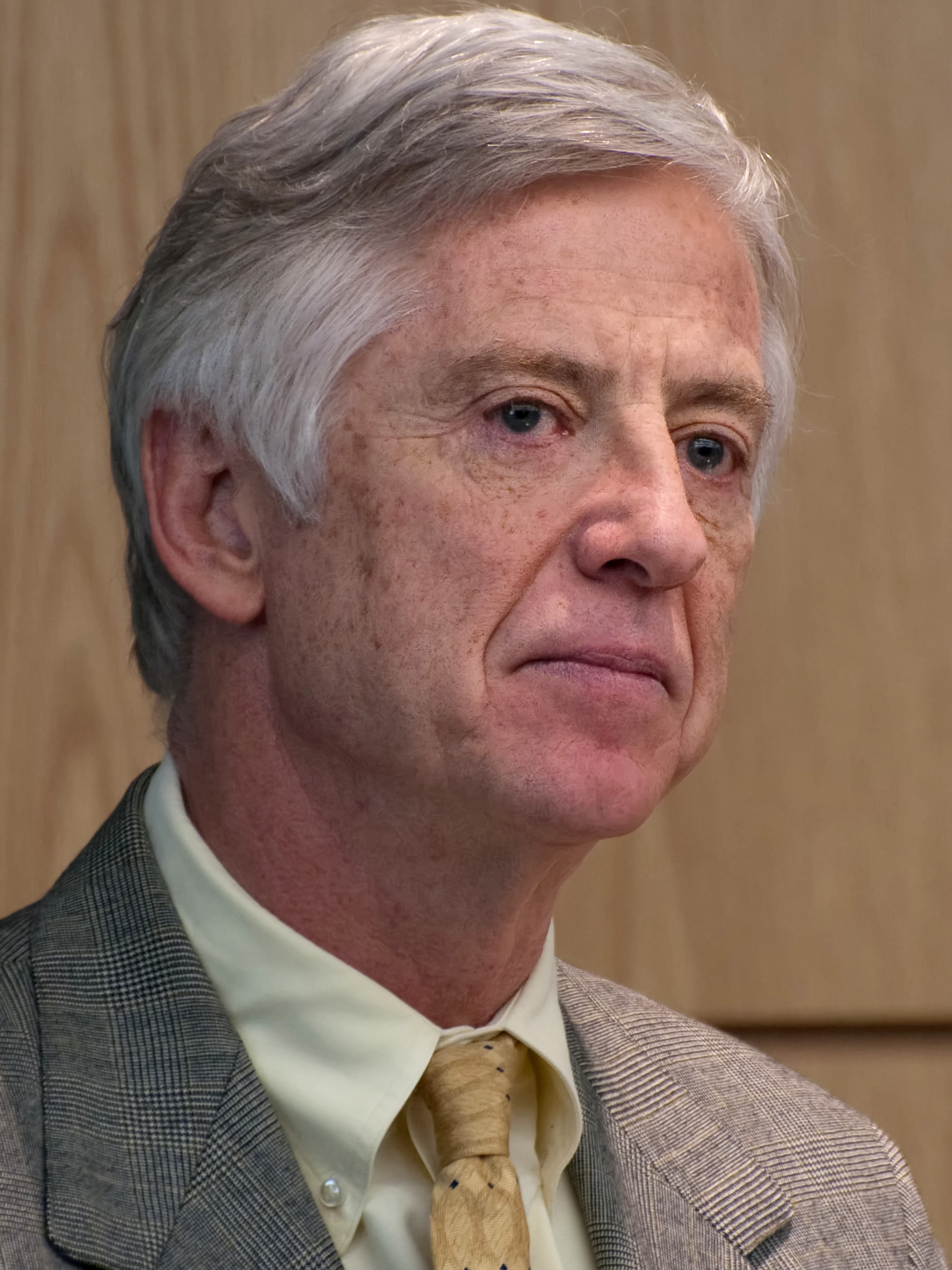

Candidate	Rocky Anderson	Frank R. Pignanelli
Party	Nonpartisan	Nonpartisan
Popular vote	22,254	19,140
Percentage	53.76%	46.24%
Mayor before election
Rocky Anderson
Democratic
Elected mayor
Rocky Anderson
Democratic

The 2003 Salt Lake City mayoral election took place on November 4, 2003, to elect the Mayor of Salt Lake City, Utah. It saw the reelection of incumbent mayor Rocky Anderson, who defeated former Democratic Party minority leader of the Utah House of Representatives Frank R. Pignanelli.

=== Primary election ===
The nonpartisan primary election was held on October 7, 2003.

2003 Salt Lake City mayoral primary election
Candidate	Votes	%
Ross C. "Rocky" Anderson (incumbent)	11,424	44.85
Frank R. Pignanelli	7,770	30.23
Molonai T. Hola	6,185	24.28
F. Joseph Irish	102	0.40
Lawerence Rey Topham	29	0.23
Total votes	25,510	100
Voter turnout	29.28%	

=== General election ===
2003 Salt Lake City mayoral election
Candidate	Votes	%
Ross C. "Rocky" Anderson (incumbent)	22,254	53.76
Frank R. Pignanelli	19,140	46.24
Write-in candidates	2	0.00
Total votes	41,396	100
Voter turnout	47.95%	

== 2007 ==
2007 Salt Lake City mayoral election
← 2003	November 6, 2007	2011 →
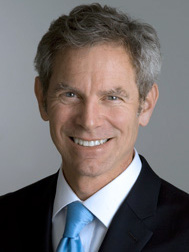

Candidate	Ralph Becker	Dave Buhler
Party	Nonpartisan	Nonpartisan
Popular vote	27,556	15,524
Percentage	63.77%	35.93%
Mayor before election
Rocky Anderson
Democratic
Elected mayor
Ralph Becker
Democratic

The 2007 Salt Lake City mayoral election took place on November 6, 2007, to elect the Mayor of Salt Lake City, Utah. It saw the election of Ralph Becker.

Incumbent mayor Rocky Anderson did not seek reelection.

=== Primary election ===
The nonpartisan primary election was held on September 11, 2007.

2007 Salt Lake City mayoral primary election
Candidate	Votes	%
Ralph Becker	10,486	38.50
Dave Buhler	7,570	27.79
Jenny Wilson	6,364	23.36
Keith S. Christensen	2,295	8.43
J.P. Hughes	378	1.39
John M. Renteria	53	0.19
Quinn Cady McDonough	42	0.15
Rainer Huck	37	0.14
Robert "Lot" Muscheck	14	0.05
Total votes	27,239	100

=== General election ===
2007 Salt Lake City mayoral election
Candidate	Votes	%
Ralph Becker	27,556	63.77
Dave Buhler	15,524	35.93
Write-in candidates	129	0.30
Total votes	43,209	100

== 2011 ==
2011 Salt Lake City mayoral election
← 2007	November 8, 2011	2015 →
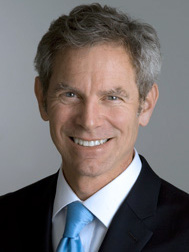

Candidate	Ralph Becker	J. Allen Kimball
Party	Nonpartisan	Nonpartisan
Popular vote	14,189	4,519
Percentage	74.91%	23.86%
Mayor before election
Ralph Becker
Democratic
Elected mayor
Ralph Becker
Democratic

The 2011 Salt Lake City mayoral election took place on November 8, 2011, to elect the Mayor of Salt Lake City, Utah. It saw the reelection of Ralph Becker.

Because only two candidates made the ballot, no primary election needed to be held.

=== General election ===
Challenging incumbent mayor Ralph Becker was Republican retired businessman J. Allen Kimball. Kimball was widely unknown to voters, and was considered an underdog candidate.

2011 Salt Lake City mayoral election
Candidate	Votes	%
Ralph Becker (incumbent)	14,189	74.91
J. Allen Kimball	4,519	23.86
Write-in candidates	234	1.24
Total votes	18,942	100

== 2015 ==
2015 Salt Lake City mayoral election
← 2011	November 3, 2015	2019 →
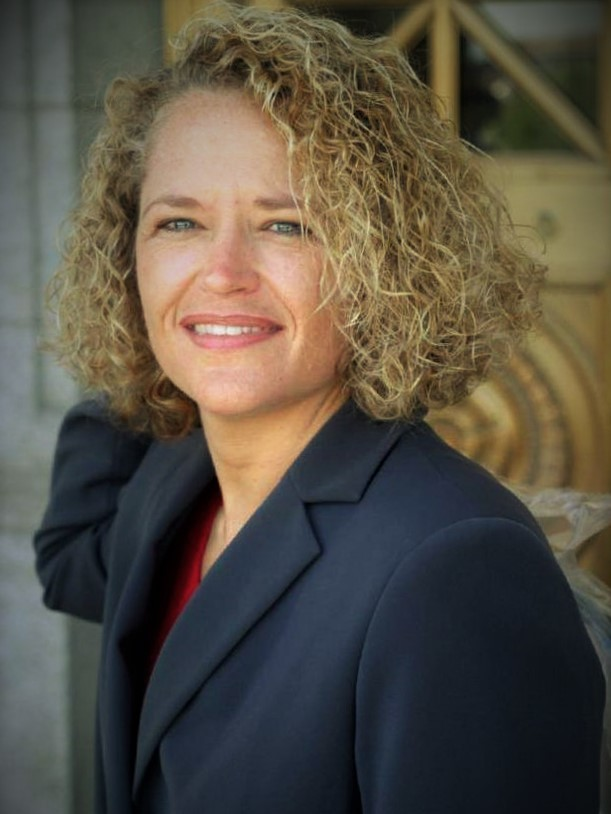

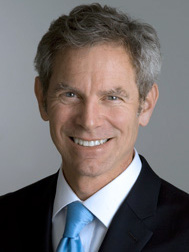
Candidate	Jackie Biskupski	Ralph Becker
Party	Nonpartisan	Nonpartisan
Popular vote	19,896	18,702
Percentage	51.55%	48.45%
Mayor before election
Ralph Becker
Democratic
Elected mayor
Jackie Biskupski
Democratic

The 2015 Salt Lake City mayoral election took place on November 3, 2015, to elect the Mayor of Salt Lake City, Utah. The election was held concurrently with various other local elections, and was officially nonpartisan.

Incumbent Mayor Ralph Becker, a Democrat in office since 2008, sought a third term in office, but was defeated by Jackie Biskupski.

A primary election was held on August 11 to determine the two candidates that moved on to the November general election.

=== Candidates ===
Declared

- Ralph Becker, incumbent Mayor
- Jackie Biskupski, former State Representative
- George Chapman, community activist
- Luke Garrott, City Councilman
- Dave Robinson, businessman

Withdrawn

- Jim Dabakis, state senator and former chairman of the Utah Democratic Party

Declined

- Rocky Anderson, former mayor and Justice Party nominee for President of the United States in 2012
- Kyle LaMalfa, City Councilman
- Charlie Luke, City Councilman
- Stan Penfold, City Councilman
- Jill Remington Love, Director of the Salt Lake City Community and Economic Development Department and former City Councilwoman

=== Primary election ===
2015 Salt Lake City mayoral primary election
Candidate	Votes	%
Jackie Biskupski	13,278	46.06%
Ralph Becker (incumbent)	8,823	30.61%
Luke Garrott	3,764	13.06%
George Chapman	1,875	6.50%
Dave Robinson	1,085	3.76%
Total votes	28,825	

=== General election ===
2015 Salt Lake City mayoral election
Candidate	Votes	%
Jackie Biskupski	19,896	51.55%
Ralph Becker (incumbent)	18,702	48.45%
Total votes	38,598	

== 2019 ==
2019 Salt Lake City mayoral election
← 2015	November 5, 2019	2023 →
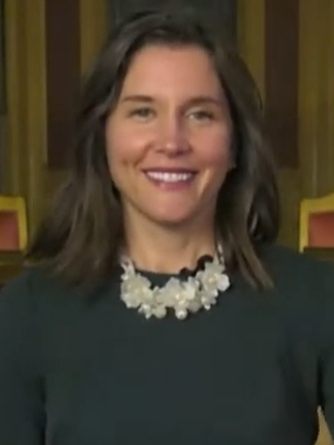
Candidate	Erin Mendenhall	Luz Escamilla
Party	Nonpartisan	Nonpartisan
Popular vote	25,502	18,342
Percentage	58.17%	41.83%
Mayor before election
Jackie Biskupski
Democratic
Elected mayor
Erin Mendenhall
Democratic

The 2019 Salt Lake City mayoral election took place on November 5, 2019, to elect the mayor of Salt Lake City, Utah. The election was held concurrently with various other local elections, and is officially nonpartisan.

In what was regarded to be a surprise, first-term incumbent mayor Jackie Biskupski announced on March 16, 2019, that she would not be seeking a second term, citing "a “serious and complex family situation".

A primary election was held on August 15 to determine the two candidates that moved on to the November general election. Erin Mendenhall defeated Luz Escamilla in the runoff.

=== Primary election ===
2019 Salt Lake City mayoral primary election
Candidate	Votes	%
Erin Mendenhall	9,046	24.27
Luz Escamilla	8,015	21.51
Jim Dabakis	7,531	20.21
David Garbett	6,238	16.74
David Ibarra	3,046	8.17
Stan Penfold	2,528	6.78
Rainer Huck	566	1.52
Richard N. Goldberger	296	0.79
Voter turnout	11.66%	

=== General election ===
2019 Salt Lake City mayoral election
Candidate	Votes	%
Erin Mendenhall	25,502	58.17%
Luz Escamilla	18,342	41.83%
Voter turnout	%	
