= 2015 Salt Lake City mayoral election =

- November 3, 2015
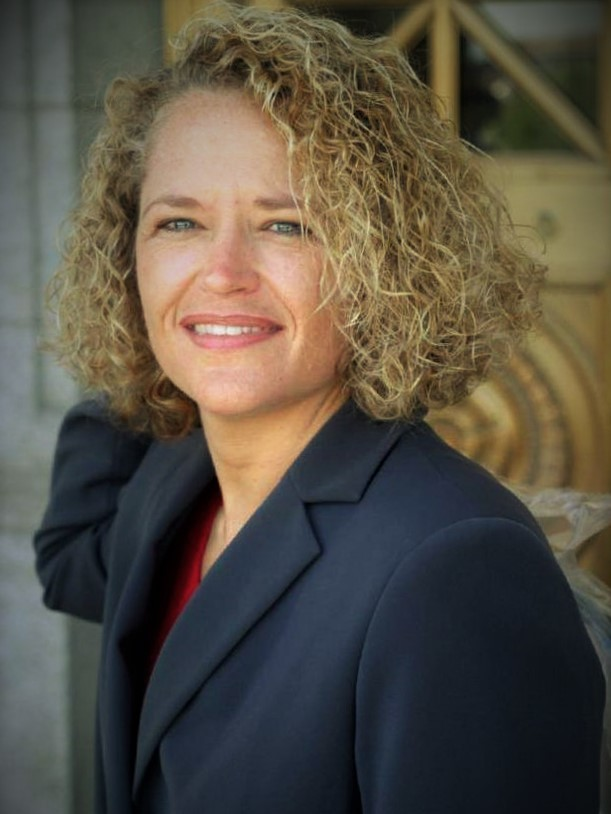

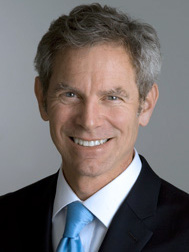
Candidate	Jackie Biskupski	Ralph Becker
Party	Nonpartisan	Nonpartisan
Popular vote	19,896	18,702
Percentage	51.55%	48.45%
Mayor before election
Ralph Becker
Democratic
Elected mayor
Jackie Biskupski
Democratic

The 2015 Salt Lake City mayoral election took place on November 3, 2015, to elect the Mayor of Salt Lake City, Utah. The election was held concurrently with various other local elections, and was officially nonpartisan.

Incumbent Mayor Ralph Becker, a Democrat in office since 2008, sought a third term in office, but was narrowly defeated by Jackie Biskupski.

A primary election was held on August 11 to determine the two candidates that moved on to the November general election.

== Candidates ==
=== Declared ===
- Ralph Becker, incumbent Mayor
- Jackie Biskupski, former State Representative
- George Chapman, community activist
- Luke Garrott, City Councilman
- Dave Robinson, businessman

=== Withdrawn ===
- Jim Dabakis, State Senator and former chairman of the Utah Democratic Party

=== Declined ===
- Rocky Anderson, former Mayor and Justice Party nominee for President of the United States in 2012
- Kyle LaMalfa, City Councilman
- Charlie Luke, City Councilman
- Stan Penfold, City Councilman
- Jill Remington Love, Director of the Salt Lake City Community and Economic Development Department and former City Councilwoman

== Primary election ==
=== Polling ===
Poll source	Date(s) administered	Sample size	Margin of error	Ralph Becker	Jackie Biskupski	Jim Dabakis	Luke Garrott	Other	Undecided
Dan Jones	April 9–15, 2015	366	± 5.1%	33%	12%	16%	9%	—	30%

=== Endorsements ===
Jackie Biskupski
- Jim Dabakis, State Senator, former chairman of the Utah Democratic Party, and former candidate

=== Results ===
Salt Lake City mayoral primary election, 2015
Party	Candidate	Votes	%
nonpartisan candidate	Jackie Biskupski	13,278	46.06%
nonpartisan candidate	Ralph Becker (incumbent)	8,823	30.61%
nonpartisan candidate	Luke Garrott	3,764	13.06%
nonpartisan candidate	George Chapman	1,875	6.50%
nonpartisan candidate	Dave Robinson	1,085	3.76%
Total votes		28,825	
Majority		4,455	15.46%

== General election ==
=== Results ===
Salt Lake City mayoral election, 2015
Party	Candidate	Votes	%
nonpartisan candidate	Jackie Biskupski	19,896	51.55%
nonpartisan candidate	Ralph Becker (incumbent)	18,702	48.45%
Total votes		38,598	
Majority		1,194	3.09%
