= Flags of Salt Lake City =

City emblem

Sego Flag
- Use: City flag
- Proportion: 5:3
- Adopted: October 6, 2020; 6 years ago
- Designed by: Arianna Meinking and Elio Kennedy-Yoon

There are four flags of Salt Lake City. The primary one, the Sego Flag, consists of two horizontal bars of blue and white with a sego lily in the canton. It was adopted in 2020 after a city-wide contest to replace a previous flag. The blue and white stripes symbolize the water and salt of the Great Salt Lake, on the shores of which the city stands. Additionally, the white recalls the Winter Olympics, which were held in Salt Lake City in 2002. Sego is the state flower of Utah, recognized for its resistance to arid climate and the importance of the plant's edible bulbs to Shoshone and Latter-day Saint pioneers. Three sego petals in the flag refer to the fact that Salt Lake City is the only state capital with a three-word name. The golden center of the sego is intended to symbolize the future of the city. This is the fourth flag in the history of the city.

In May 2025, the city council approved mayor Erin Mendenhall's designs for three new official city flags:

- the Sego Celebration Flag, based on the Juneteenth flag;
- the Sego Belonging Flag, based on the Progress Pride flag;
- and the Sego Visibility Flag, based on the transgender pride flag.

Each is identical to the flag it was based on, except for the addition of a sego lily in the canton. The flags were adopted in response to a new state law restricting the flying of the unofficial flags they were based on.

Sego Celebration Flag

Sego Belonging Flag

Sego Visibility Flag

== History ==
Reconstruction of the flag raised in city on 24 July 1849

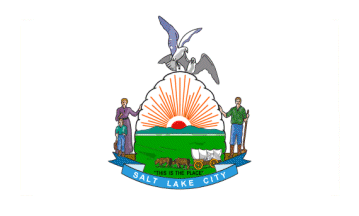
Second flag (1969–2006)

Third flag (2006–2020)

The first city flag was made in 1854 and was described as "elegant banner of this city whereon is inscribed 'Municipality, Order, Justice, G.S.L. city'."

The second adopted city flag was designed in 1963 by J. Rulon Hales, the winner of a contest run by the Deseret News. The first version of the flag was made by art students from Highland High School and officially adopted for use on November 13, 1969. It included seagulls, pioneers, a covered wagon, and the sun rising over the Wasatch Mountains in the middle of a white background. The center was in the general shape of a beehive, which is a symbol of industry and relates to the founding of Salt Lake City and its Latter-day Saint heritage.

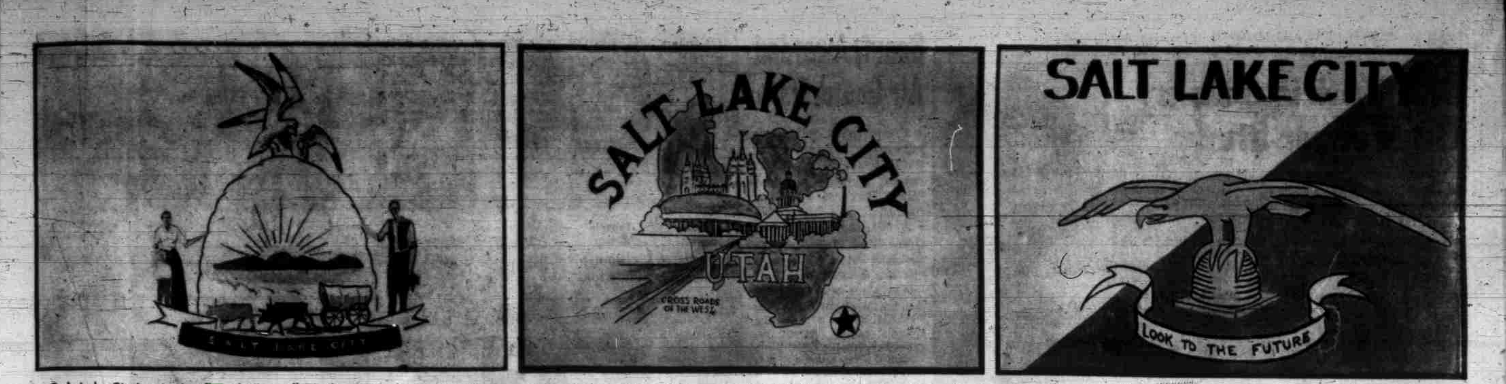
Flags from the city's 1963 flag contest

The third design of the flag was approved on October 4, 2006, by the Salt Lake City Council. Rocky Anderson, the mayor of Salt Lake City at the time, had sponsored a contest in 2004 to redesign the flag. Anderson argued that the old flag was too exclusive, focused entirely on the city's Latter-day Saint heritage, and was "visually boring".

The contest, which received more than 50 entries, did not produce any designs that the city council felt had the "symbolic visuals that could be associated with Salt Lake City". They then formed a subcommittee to work with the mayor's office to create new designs for the flag. The final design was approved with a 4–2 margin.

In May 2020, the city government opened a two-month contest to redesign the flag with a $3,000 prize for the winning entry. The city received over 600 design entries, of which eight finalists were selected in July by the Flag Design Review Committee for public review. The winning design, announced in September 2020, was created through the merger of two finalists created by Arianna Meinking and Elio Kennedy-Yoon from West High School. The design features a sego lily, the Utah state flower, in the canton amidst horizontal fields of blue and white. It was sent to the city council for consideration with the endorsement of mayor Erin Mendenhall and adopted on October 6, 2020.

== See also ==
- Flag of Utah
- Flag of Trenton, Georgia, flag adopted in response to the ban on displaying the old state flag
- Flag of Missoula, Montana -- officially the LGBTQ pride flag in response to a similar state ban
