= Erin Mendenhall =

American politician (born 1980)

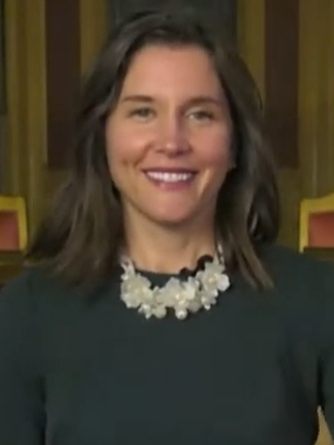

36th Mayor of Salt Lake City
- Incumbent
- Assumed office January 6, 2020
- Preceded by: Jackie Biskupski

Member of the Salt Lake City Council from the 5th district
- In office January 6, 2014 – January 6, 2020
- Preceded by: Jill Remington Love
- Succeeded by: Darin Mano

Personal details
- Born: June 8, 1980 (age 46) Arizona, U.S.
- Party: Democratic
- Spouses: Jared Mendenhall (div. 2014) Kyle LaMalfa (m. 2015)
- Children: 3
- Education: University of Utah (BA, MS)

Erin Mendenhall (born June 8, 1980) is an American politician and activist who has been serving as the mayor of Salt Lake City, Utah since 2020. Upon taking office as Salt Lake City’s 36th mayor, Mendenhall became the city’s third and youngest woman in the role (after Deedee Corradini and Jackie Biskupski). Prior to assuming office, Mendenhall represented the city’s 5th district on the Salt Lake City Council.

== Early life and education ==
Mendenhall was born in Arizona and moved to Sandy, Utah, when she was seven in 1987. Her father, Don, died from Hodgkin lymphoma when she was 14 in 1994. She graduated from the University of Utah with a Bachelor of Arts degree in gender studies and a certificate in Non Profit Leadership and Management. In 2019, she earned a Master of Science degree in science and technology from the University of Utah.

== Early career ==
After college, Mendenhall conducted air-quality testing and internal auditing at Sterigenics, which sterilizes medical equipment.

She first entered politics as an air-quality activist with Utah Moms for Clean Air, but in 2010 moved on to co-found the non-profit Breathe Utah because "she quickly realized she could more effectively fight for changes as someone sitting at the decision-making table rather than protesting outside the door."

== City Council (2014–2020) ==
Mendenhall was elected to the Salt Lake City Council in November 2013 to represent District 5, which includes the Ballpark, Liberty Wells, Central 9th, and East Liberty Park neighborhoods. She took office in January 2014 and improving air quality became her signature issue. In May 2014, Mendenhall was appointed to the Utah Air Quality Board, which is the "primary air quality policy maker for the State of Utah."

In 2015, Mendenhall and the City Council voted unanimously to cut campaign-finance limits, reducing the maximum contribution to a mayoral election from $7,500 to $3,500, and the maximum contribution to a City Council candidate from $1,600 to $750.

In July 2017, Mendenhall led on the passage of an ordinance to crack down on "businesses that are hotbeds of crime." The ordinance was designed to close a loophole that led to stop motels and hotels on State Street allowing sex work and drug dealing without legal consequence. "We are drawing a line in the sand," Mendenhall said.

In 2017, Mendenhall was re-elected to the City Council with 84% of the vote.

In November 2017, Mendenhall led the Salt Lake City Council to unanimously approve an ordinance limiting the capacity of homeless shelters to 200.

In March 2018, the Utah Legislature passed a bill that cut Salt Lake City out of the process of developing an inland port in the city's Northwest Quadrant. The legislation also took 100% of the tax revenue generated from the Inland Port while denying the city's mayor a seat on the Inland Port Authority and forcing the city to pay for police and fire department coverage of the area.

In July 2018, Salt Lake City Mayor Jackie Biskupski withdrew from negotiations with the state government over the port project. With the state moving the Port project forward without the city's input, Mendenhall re-opened negotiations in her capacity as chair of the City Council.

Based on those negotiations, on July 18, 2018, the Legislature passed additional legislation that required 10% of tax revenue generated by the inland port to be invested in affordable housing in Salt Lake City. The bill also required the Port to pay the city for its share of taxes needed to cover the cost of city services including police and fire. In an editorial, the Salt Lake Tribune called the bill "a great improvement over what sits on the books."

== 2019 mayoral campaign ==
Mendenhall was the last of nine candidates to declare her candidacy for mayor, doing so on March 24, 2019, citing her "hands-on" experience.

Mendenhall officially launched her campaign on April 14, 2019, outside an air-quality monitoring station at the Salt Lake Center for Science Education, a STEM focused charter school in the historically underrepresented Rose Park neighborhood. "My time on the City Council shows how I get results," Mendenhall said. "As chair of the council, I made a seat for our city at the table when there wasn’t one, when the state was ready to move ahead with the inland port without Salt Lake City."

A poll conducted in June by Dan Jones & Associates for the Salt Lake Chamber of Commerce showed Mendenhall in third place with 12% support. A Salt Lake Tribune-Hinckley Institute of Politics poll conducted in late July by the Cicero Group also found Mendenhall in third place with 14% support.

Mendenhall leaned on her experience on the city council and positioned herself as the candidate best able to get the most from the city government. "After 12 years of mayors with experience on Capitol Hill instead of City Hall, Salt Lake City deserves a mayor with the right experience for a change," Mendenhall wrote in an August 7, 2019 op-ed in the Salt Lake Tribune.

The nonpartisan primary election was held on August 13, 2019. Mendenhall finished in first place with 24.27%, topping State Senators Luz Escamilla and Jim Dabakis to advance to the general election.

Mendenhall released a series of policy proposals, including plans focusing on affordable housing, building a high-tech ecosystem in the city, and planting 1,000 new trees a year on the city's West side.

In the 2019 Salt Lake City mayoral election, Mendenhall defeated State Senator Luz Escamilla 58.17% to 41.83% to become the 36th mayor of Salt Lake City. Mendenhall became the city's third female mayor (after Deedee Corradini and Jackie Biskupski).

== Mayor (2020–present) ==
=== Air quality ===
In her inaugural address, Mendenhall announced that city departments would begin factoring impacts on air quality into every decision, prompting the director of the Utah Clean Air Partnership to call the move "phenomenal leadership."

In 2021, the utility that provides electricity to the city, Rocky Mountain Power, announced it would not be able to deliver renewable electricity until "closer to 2050"— 20 years later than pledged. Mendenhall negotiated a first-in-the-nation partnership with more than a dozen other municipalities to create a Community Renewable Energy Agency that will deliver net-100% renewable electricity citywide by 2030.

Mendenhall negotiated a separate partnership with Park City, Summit County, Utah Valley University, Deer Valley Resort, and Park City Mountain to construct an 80-megawatt solar farm in Tooele County to fulfill 80% of the city government's power needs.

Under Mendenhall's Sustainable Development Policy, all new buildings that receive funding from the city must meet energy efficiency standards and be emission-free.

To allow more city residents to participate in the State of Utah's lawnmower trade-in program, which provides rebates for residents wishing to trade-out their gas-burning lawnmower for an electric model, Mendenhall negotiated with the state to invest city dollars in the program earmarked for city residents. A quarter of the rebates were earmarked for West side residents. The change resulted in four times as many Salt Lake City residents participating.

Additionally, the city is transitioning its gas-powered riding lawnmowers to an all-electric fleet in order to reduce pollution.

To promote the use of public transit, Mendenhall proposed and partially-funded the Free Fare February program in 2022, which made the entire Utah Transit Authority system free to ride for a month. "Final data provided by UTA for 'Free Fare February' shows a 16% increase in weekday ridership system-wide; a 58% spike on Saturdays (with an astounding 202% increase on Frontrunner trains); and a nearly 33% increase on Sundays (when only buses and TRAX are available)." The success of the program led to legislators proposing eliminating UTA fares permanently. Governor Spencer Cox said he supports the idea, but the Utah Legislature has yet to embrace the measure.

In 2022, Mendenhall also partnered with the Salt Lake City School District to provide free Hive Passes to city schoolchildren and teachers, encouraging their use of public transportation and reducing the burden on parents.

The Mendenhall Administration has expanded public transit options by opening a new TRAX station and bus shelters. Two new bus routes have been launched, along with an on-demand service in partnership with UTA to help West side residents access the city's public transit system.

Mendenhall has followed-through on her campaign pledge to plant 1,000 new trees on Salt Lake City's West side each year of her term. Each tree is expected to generate half a million pounds of oxygen and remove 20,000 pounds of pollution from the air each year. The program is intended to reduce a significant disparity in the urban canopy between the city's East and West sides, the latter of which historically measures higher levels of air pollution.

=== LGBTQ+ equality ===
In 2021, Mendenhall and the city council extended the city government's health insurance policy to cover gender-affirming surgeries for workers and their covered family members. The decision earned praise from Equality Utah executive Director Troy Williams, who told the Salt Lake Tribune: "Mayor Mendenhall and the Salt Lake City Council have time and again demonstrated unwavering love and support to the LGBTQ community. They are sending a powerful message to their transgender employees that they are loved and accepted as their full, authentic selves."

In 2019, Salt Lake City received a score of 66 points on the Human Rights Campaign's annual Municipal Equality Index. In 2020, the score improved to 75. The city earned a 100-point score for the first time in 2021 and again in 2022.

Mendenhall has been outspoken on behalf of the state's LGBTQ+ residents. In March 2022, after the Utah Legislature overrode the governor's veto of a bill mandating that middle and high school students participating in public school sports play on teams consistent with the gender they were assigned at birth, Mendenhall wrote: "Is this who we are as a state? I’m at a loss. This is decidedly not 'The Utah Way' and I’m ashamed at the way some of our state’s leaders are playing politics with children’s lives. To Utah’s transgender kids: I’m sorry this is happening to you and some of our leaders seem intent on going out of their way to persecute and punish you just for being who you are. They do not speak for all of us. You are perfect as you are. You are loved. I stand with you."

On the eve of the 2023 Utah Pride Festival, the Utah Pride Center recognized Mendenhall with its inaugural Solomon Award for her allyship of the state's LGBTQ+ residents. "It means a lot to me because I feel like there’s not enough I can do to be an ally," Mendenhall said. "I've tried to show up and bring the city to show up in more ways than we have before."

=== 2020 terrorist threat ===
In April 2020 during the COVID-19 pandemic, according to a police affidavit, Mendenhall was threatened by a man who "stated the mayor needs to open up the city. If she doesn’t, she’ll be forcibly removed from office. There’s a protest tomorrow and if things don’t change, a civil war is coming, and the police can’t stop me." The man was arrested and booked for making a terroristic threat and electronic communication harassment.

=== Threats and security incidents ===
In 2024 and 2025, Mendenhall was the target of multiple threats connected to city policy decisions, part of a broader pattern of political threats and harassment directed at public officials. On May 20, 2024, a Farmington man, Jason Guy Rogers, was arrested after police said he made violent threats toward the mayor following the adoption of new city flag designs and was observed attempting to enter the Salt Lake City–County Building. Prosecutors alleged that the man posted messages on social media encouraging harm toward Mendenhall and her family. He later pleaded guilty to misdemeanor stalking on December 4, 2025.

=== Ryan Outlaw incident ===
Amidst an ongoing investigation into the death of Ryan Outlaw, an African-American man wounded in a stabbing denied medical aid by police officers, Mayor Mendenhall defended the two officers being investigated, stating her belief that "our officers we believe did as they were trained." Asked if she wanted officers to be "able and willing" to provide first aid, Mendenhall responded "I want our officers to be safe, that’s their job."

=== Homelessness ===
Homelessness has emerged as a major issue throughout Mendenhall's term. Arguing that state authorities had unfairly concentrated the responsibility of dealing with the homeless population on Salt Lake City, Mayor Mendenhall reversed her prior support for an expansion of homeless shelters in September 2021 and supported the institution of a citywide ban on the construction of further shelters in October 2021, which would be extended to last until May 2023.

Mendenhall has supported a policy of "abatements," police raids to scatter encampments of the homeless. In an Instagram question session in April 2023, Mendenhall estimated the annual cost of the policy as being over four million dollars, 2.2 million of which being police overtime. 50 such abatements took place in 2021 alone. Critics, including former Mayor Rocky Anderson, have argued for a sanctioned central campground; in an interview with Fox13, Mendenhall declared her opposition to the proposal, stating "heck no...Salt Lake City is not doing a designated camping area," and arguing that the proposal was a "genie" that the city could not afford. In September 2023, Mendenhall reversed her position and alongside state officials announced that they would authorize a sanctioned camp.

=== The Utah (Pantages) Theater Sale and Demolition Controversy ===
The Utah Theater, once known as the Pantages Theater, was a more than century old performing arts hall located on Main Street in the heart of downtown Salt Lake City. Despite its former majesty, the theater had fallen into disrepair and stood vacant. The theater was purchased by the Salt Lake City Redevelopment Agency under the leadership of then Mayor Ralph Becker, with the promise it would be saved and restored to its former glory.

While the estimated value of the theater was around $20 million, it was eventually handed over to the developer Hines for free, even after it was discovered that they had made questionable donations to Mendenhall's mayoral campaign. Despite community efforts to save the theater, including an approved petition to add the site to the National Register of Historic Places, as well as lingering legal questions about the agreement with the developer, Mendenhall and the City Council allowed it to be demolished.

In an August 30, 2024 Salt Lake Tribune article, Hines senior director Dusty Harris was quoted stating that "While current economic conditions limit our ability to launch the initially planned project for this site at this time..." The article highlighted the developer's request to pave part of the theater property as a "temporary" step, and insists it remains "committed" to building a 31-story high-rise with luxury units and other amenities. Many are questioning why the Hines deal hasn't been cancelled years after it was inked. With the theater was demolished, local businesses evicted, and deadline after deadline having passed with no consequences for Hines, they garner all the benefits of the property rising in value as some of the most prime real estate in the capital city, while the taxpayers get almost nothing but unfulfilled promises and a possible asphalt parking lot in return.

=== Stadium subsidy ===
In 2024, Mendenhall supported a proposal to spend $1 billion of taxpayer money on building a stadium for a potential NHL expansion team.

== 2023 mayoral campaign ==
On April 12, 2023, Mendenhall announced her candidacy for re-election in a video to supporters, declaring "this is a special time for Salt Lake City. Like all great cities, we're growing. We're changing. Our culture, our nightlife, our high-tech job market. These last few years have tested us, covered the earthquakes, the inland hurricane, but we've emerged stronger than ever. Salt Lakers are resilient, creative, and innovative, and we've worked hard to earn real results, to make real progress."

Mendenhall's announcement included a long list of endorsements, including former U.S. Representative Ben McAdams, Salt Lake County Mayor Jenny Wilson, two state senators and five state representatives, the chairs of 14 community councils, the unions representing the city's police officers and firefighters, as well as the Utah AFL-CIO, Central Utah Federation of Labor, AFSCME Local 1004, Operating Engineers Local 3, Laborers Local 295, Bricklayers and Allied Craftworkers Local 1, and the American Federation of Teachers-Utah.

She followed up the video with a kickoff event at The Neighborhood Hive in the city's Sugar House neighborhood on April 15, 2023. "Our city isn't perfect, but it is great," Mendenhall told supporters. "Our growth and the relentless commitment of the people who have invested their hearts into this city are fueling truly amazing opportunities." Mendenhall was introduced by civil rights leader Rev. France Davis of Calvary Baptist Church.

Mendenhall ran against former mayor and senator/presidential candidate Rocky Anderson and local activist and community organizer Michael (Patton) Valentine. The election was the first in the city's history to utilize ranked choice voting for a mayoral election.

Mendenhall was reelected winning 58% of the vote in the first round.

=== Fundraising ===
In a campaign finance report filed on February 15, 2023 — the first since Anderson announced his candidacy, Mendenhall reported raising $200,811, spending $88,073, and having $250,972 in cash on hand. Anderson reported raising $126,461, spending $76,781, and having $49,780 in cash on hand. Michael (Patton) Valentine reported raising $110, spending $93.82, and having $16.18 on hand.

In a campaign finance report filed on July 3, 2023, Mendenhall reported raising $212,195, spending $101,780, and having $360,003 in cash on hand. Her campaign reported receiving 603 total contributions during the period from 504 individual donors. Anderson reported raising $101,780 from over 400 individual donors, spending $60,927, and having $90,632 in cash on hand. Valentine reported raising $115, spending $98.65, and has $32.53 in cash on hand.

== Awards ==
- In 2020, Mendenhall was recognized by the Ecological Society of America as its 13th annual Regional Policy Award recipient because of her "life-long commitment to science-based advocacy for clean air."
- In 2021, Mendenhall was given BioUtah's "Friend of the Industry" award for her support for the state's life sciences industry.
- In 2021, Mendenhall was voted "Best Elected Official" by readers of the City Weekly newspaper.
- In 2022, Mendenhall was given the "Excellence in Community Action - Public Official" award from Community Action Partnership of Utah.
- In 2022, Mendenhall was again voted "Best Elected Official" by City Weekly readers.
- In 2023, the Utah Clean Air Partnership recognized Mendenhall with its Person of the Year award at its annual summit.
- In 2023, the Utah Pride Center recognized Mendenhall with its inaugural Solomon Award for her ally ship of the state's LGBTQ+ residents.

== Personal life ==
It was reported in November 2014 that Erin Mendenhall and fellow council member Kyle LaMalfa were having an extramarital affair. She and LaMalfa disclosed their relationship to City Attorney Margaret Plane, who stated there were no legal or ethical problems, contradicting a Utah state law at the time and until 2019, which banned adultery and fornication. She and LaMalfa later married, and now have three children. As of 2026, Mendenhall and LaMalfa are filing for divorce.

Political offices
Preceded by Jackie Biskupski	Mayor of Salt Lake City; 2020–present	Incumbent
