= 2019 Salt Lake City mayoral election =

- November 5, 2019
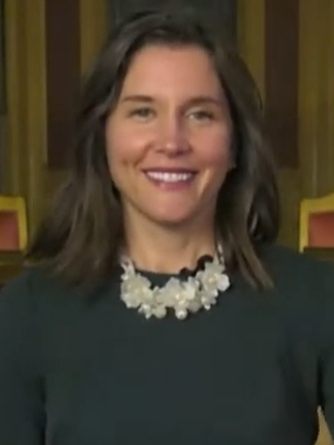

Candidate	Erin Mendenhall	Luz Escamilla
Party	Nonpartisan	Nonpartisan
Popular vote	25,502	18,342
Percentage	58.17%	41.83%
Mayor before election
Jackie Biskupski
Democratic
Elected mayor
Erin Mendenhall
Democratic

The 2019 Salt Lake City mayoral election took place on November 5, 2019, to elect the mayor of Salt Lake City, Utah. The election was held concurrently with various other local elections, and is officially nonpartisan.

In what was regarded to be a surprise, first-term incumbent mayor Jackie Biskupski announced on March 16, 2019, that she would not be seeking a second term, citing a "serious and complex family situation".

A primary election was held on August 13 to determine the two candidates that moved on to the November general election. Erin Mendenhall defeated Luz Escamilla in the runoff.

== Primary election ==
=== Polling ===
Poll source	Date(s) administered	Sample size	Margin of error	Jackie Biskupskie	Jim Dabakis	Luz Escamilla	David Ibarra	Erin Mendenhall	Other	Undecided
Dan Jones & Associates/Salt; Lake Chamber of Commerce	Jun 11-Jul 1, 2019	149 (LV)	–	–	30%	15%	8%	12%	10% (Note: David Garbett and Stan Penfold with 5%)	25%
Lighthouse Research/Jim Dabakis (Note: Poll sponsored by Jim Dabakis while he was exploring a bid)	Released December 10, 2018	400 (LV)	–	21%	27%	–	3%	–	8% (Note: Stan Penfold and Ross Romero with 4%)	42%

=== Results ===
Salt Lake City mayoral primary election, 2019
Party	Candidate	Votes	%
Nonpartisan	Erin Mendenhall	9,046	24.27
Nonpartisan	Luz Escamilla	8,015	21.51
Nonpartisan	Jim Dabakis	7,531	20.21
Nonpartisan	David Garbett	6,238	16.74
Nonpartisan	David Ibarra	3,046	8.17
Nonpartisan	Stan Penfold	2,528	6.78
Nonpartisan	Rainer Huck	566	1.52
Nonpartisan	Richard N. Goldberger	296	0.79
Turnout		37,266	11.66

== General election ==
=== Polling ===
Poll source	Date(s) administered	Sample size (Note: Key: A – all adults RV – registered voters LV – likely voters V – unclear)	Margin of error	Luz Escamilla	Erin Mendenhall	Undecided
Y2 Analytics/UtahPolicy	Oct 16–22, 2019	751 (LV)	± 3.6%	43%	53%	4% (Note: Includes "not voting")
Dan Jones & Associates/Salt; Lake Chamber of Commerce	Oct 3–10, 2019	350 (LV)	± 5.23%	37%	42%	21%

Hypothetical polling

Poll source	Date(s) administered	Sample size	Margin of error	Jackie Biskupskie	Jim Dabakis	Undecided
Lighthouse Research/Jim Dabakis (Note: Poll sponsored by Jim Dabakis while he was exploring a bid)	Released December 10, 2018	400 (LV)	–	31%	42%	27%

=== Endorsements ===
Erin Mendenhall

Local officials

- Rocky Anderson, former mayor

Notable individuals

- David Ibarra, former candidate and businessman

=== Results ===
Salt Lake City mayoral election, 2019
Party	Candidate	Votes	%
Nonpartisan	Erin Mendenhall	25,502	58.17%
Nonpartisan	Luz Escamilla	18,342	41.83%
Turnout		43,844	

== Notes ==
Partisan clients
