= Stuart Reid (politician) =

American politician

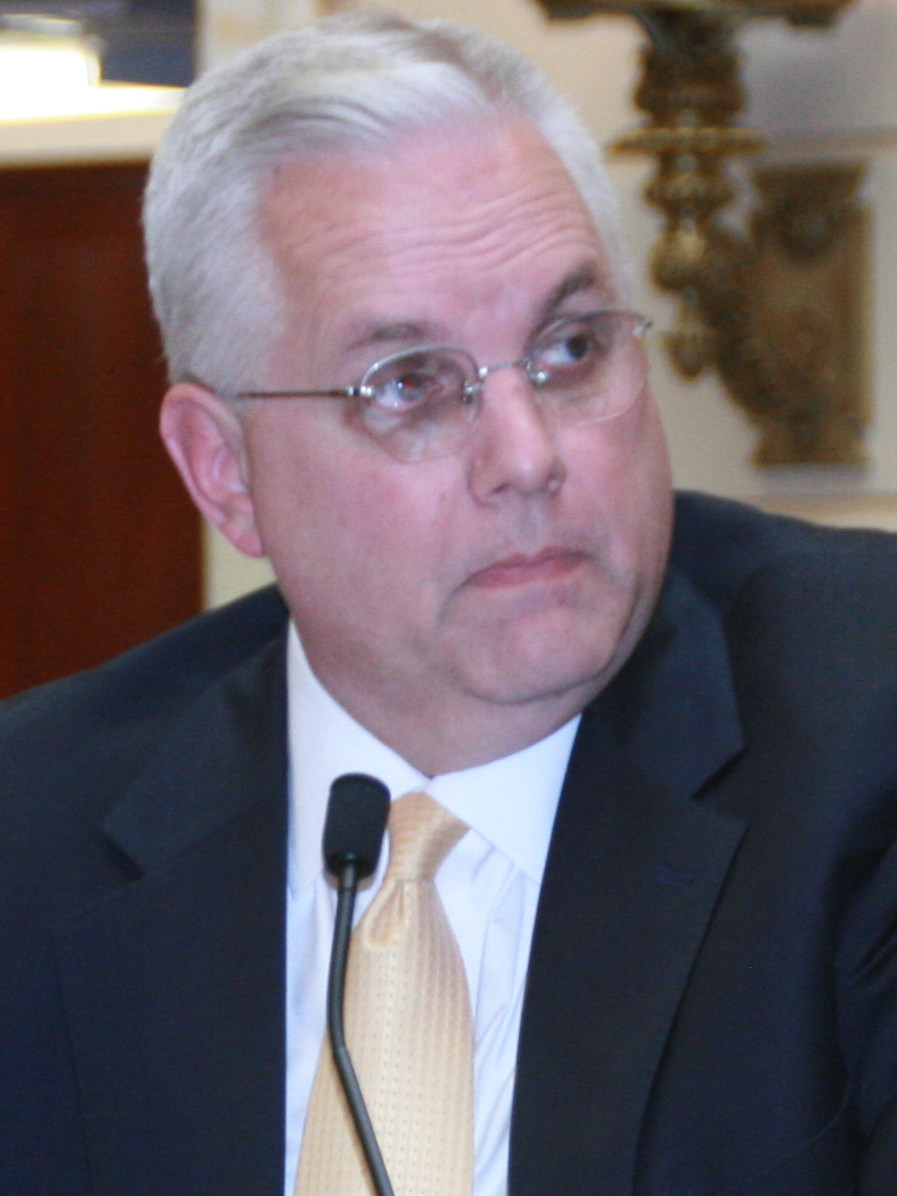

Member of the Utah Senate from the 18th district
- In office January 1, 2011 – December 31, 2014
- Preceded by: Jon J. Greiner
- Succeeded by: Ann Millner

Chair of the Salt Lake City Council
- In office 1995–1996

Member of the Salt Lake City Council from the 1st district
- In office January 1994 – March 1997

Personal details
- Party: Democratic (in 2006); Republican
- Education: Brigham Young University

Stuart C. Reid is a former American politician and a Republican member of the Utah State Senate representing District 18 from 2011 to 2015.

== Personal life, education, and career ==
Reid earned his BS and M.Ed from Brigham Young University. Reid worked as a Real Estate Agent and Economic Developer. Stuart serves as the President/CEO of SCReid, LLC, and Reid & Reid Properties, LLC, consultant and development companies that he owns and runs himself. Reid has served as a United States Army Officer. He is the former Ogden City and Salt Lake City Community and Economic Development Director. He has also served as a board number for the Salt Lake International Airport, Ogden Development Foundation, and Ogden Pioneer Days Foundation. Prior to Stuart's public service, he served as a manager of government and community relations for the Church of Jesus Christ of Latter-day Saints.

As of 2014, Stuart and his wife Laura had been married for 27 years. They have three children.

== Political career ==
=== Early career ===
Reid started his political career as a Salt Lake City Council member, representing district 1. He was elected in 1993, and took office in January 1994. In 1995, he served as the council's chairman. In Salt Lake City's 1995 mayoral election, he, more strongly than any other city council member, backed Deedee Corradini, who won the election. In March 1997, he resigned from the council in order to accept the position leading the city's Department of Community and Economic Development.

In 1999, Reid ran unsuccessfully for mayor of Salt Lake City, advancing to the general election, but losing it by a large margin to Rocky Anderson

Reid served on the Ogden/Weber Chamber Legislative Committee, the Governor's Utah State Fair Park Task Force, and the Salt Lake Area Chamber of Commerce Board of Governors.

=== Utah Senate ===
Reid was first elected to the Utah Senate in 2010. He decided not to run for reelection in 2014.

During the 2014 Legislative Session, Reid served on the following committees:

- Business, Economic Development, and Labor Appropriations Subcommittee
- Executive Offices and Criminal Justice Appropriations Subcommittee
- Senate Economic Development and Workforce Services Committee
- Senate Education Committee (chair)
- Senate Ethics Committee
- Senate Rules Committee

=== Election results ===
- 2010 When District 18 Republican Senator Jon J. Greiner left the Legislature and left the open, Reid, running as a Republican was unopposed for the June 22, 2010 Republican Primary and won the November 2, 2010 General election with 7,849 votes (60.2%) against Democratic nominee Betty Sawyer, who had run for the Utah House in 1998.
- 2006 To challenge incumbent Republican Senator Dave Thomas, Reid was unopposed for the 2006 Democratic Primary, but lost the November 7, 2006 General election to Republican nominee Jon Greiner, who had defeated Senator Thomas in the Republican Primary.

== 2014 sponsored legislation ==
Bill number and Title	Primary or Floor Sponsor	Bill status
S.B. 12 Age Limit for Tobacco and Related Products	Primary	Senate/ filed 3/13/2014
S.B. 43 Intergenerational Poverty Interventions in Public Schools	Primary	Governor Signed 4/1/2014
S.B. 76 Rural Economic Mapping and Partnership	Primary	Senate/filed 3/13/2014
S.B. 119 Sales and Use Tax Exemption Amendments	Primary	Senate/filed 3/13/2014
S.B. 150 Education Task Force Reauthorization	Primary	Governor Signed 3/28/2014
S.B. 151 Religious Freedom Instruction Requirements	Primary	Held in Rules Committee
S.B. 228 Geographic Diversity Amendments	Primary	Senate/filed 3/13/2014
S.J.R. 1 Second Substitute Joint Resolution on Museum Recognizing Atrocities Against American Indians	Primary	Enrolled 2/27/2014
S.J.R. 12 Joint Resolution on State Superintendent of Public Instruction	Primary	Senate/filed 3/13/2014
H.B. 134 Fourth Substitute Firearm Safety Amendments	Floor; Primary Rep. Eliason	Governor Signed 3/31/2014
H.B. 239 Front-line Teachers Data Program	Floor; Primary Rep. Nielson	House/filed 3/13/2014
H.B. 250 Local School Board Amendments	Floor; Primary Rep. Draxler	Governor Signed 4/1/2014

== Pivotal bills ==
In 2014, the Utah Legislature shot down S.B. 12 bill to raise the legal smoking age from 18 to 21. Had the bill passed, Utah would have been the first state to do so, and Salt Lake City would have been the second major city (after New York City) to raise the minimum age to 21. However, the Utah Senate killed the bill after a 12–16 vote on March 3.
