= Jackie Biskupski =

American Democratic politician

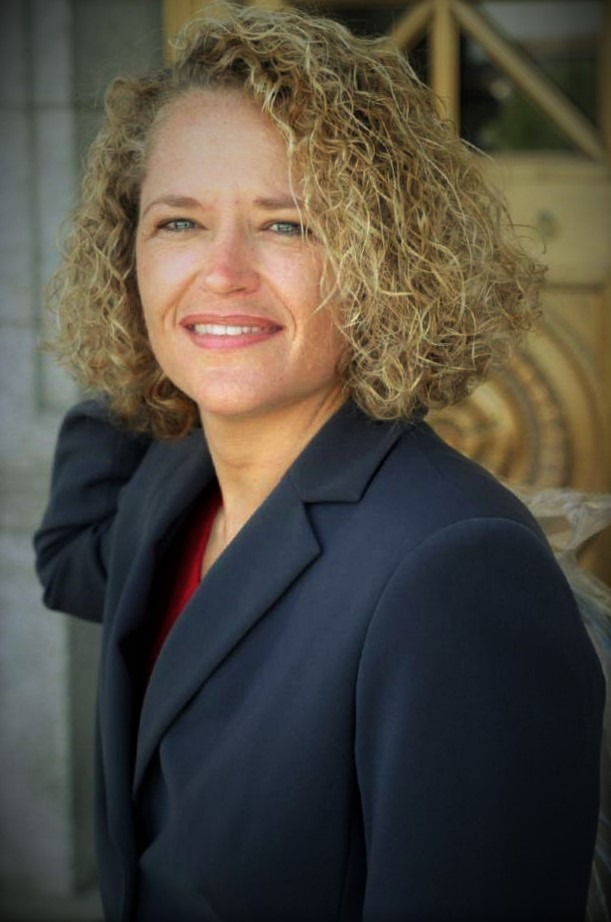

35th Mayor of Salt Lake City
- In office January 4, 2016 – January 6, 2020
- Preceded by: Ralph Becker
- Succeeded by: Erin Mendenhall

Member of the Utah House of Representatives from the 30th district
- In office January 1999 – June 2011
- Preceded by: Gene Davis
- Succeeded by: Brian Doughty

Personal details
- Born: January 11, 1966 (age 60) Hastings, Minnesota, U.S.
- Party: Democratic
- Spouse: Betty Iverson
- Children: 2
- Education: Arizona State University (BS)

Jackie Biskupski (born January 11, 1966) is an American politician who served as the 35th mayor of Salt Lake City, Utah from 2016 to 2020. A member of the Democratic Party, she previously served as a member of the Utah House of Representatives, representing the 30th District in Salt Lake County from 1999 to 2011.

== Personal life ==
In 2009, Biskupski adopted a son. On August 14, 2016, she married longtime partner Betty Iverson, who also has a son. She currently lives in the Sugar House neighborhood of Salt Lake City.

Biskupski holds a Bachelor of Science degree in criminal justice from Arizona State University.

== Early career ==
After graduating from college, Biskupski opened her own private investigation firm and later worked in the auto insurance industry. Biskupski got involved in politics after a 1995 controversy at East High School, when the Board of the Salt Lake City School District and the Utah State Legislature tried to eliminate a gay/straight student alliance club.

In 1997, Biskupski was elected to the executive committee for the Salt Lake County Democratic party as well as the board of directors for the YWCA of Salt Lake City.

== Utah Legislature ==
When elected in 1998 to the Utah House of Representatives, she became the state's first openly gay person elected to a state office. She won by a two-to-one margin even though the Eagle Forum ran an antigay ad campaign against her.

She was re-elected 6 times, serving in the legislature for 13 years before retiring in 2011.

In 2000, Biskupski unsuccessfully combated Utah's ban on adoption by same-sex parents and Utah's sodomy law. This attempt was in response to a 1998 bill sponsored by Nora B. Stephens titled Amendments to Child Welfare.

Utah Governor Gary Herbert appointed Brian Doughty in 2011 to replace Biskupski when she resigned from the House of Representatives.

She then went to work as an administrator for the Salt Lake County Sheriff's Office on January 31, 2015.

In 2011, Biskupski helped found Utah's "Real Women Run" initiative, which has hosted numerous events to encourage female participation in civic leadership and political office.

== Mayor of Salt Lake City ==
Biskupski was elected Salt Lake City Mayor on November 17, 2015, defeating two-term incumbent Ralph Becker with 51.55% of the vote, receiving 17,290 votes to Becker's 15,840. During her transition, she called for the resignation of most city department heads, drawing criticism from former Mayor Rocky Anderson and others.

During her first year in office as mayor, Biskupski made local air quality and climate change issues central to her platform. She called for Salt Lake City to be completely run on alternative energy by 2032 and a reduction in carbon emissions by 80% by 2040.

In 2016, Mayor Biskupski called for the creation of the Department of Economic Development.

In September 2016, after a year-long negotiation, Biskupski announced a new franchise agreement between Salt Lake City and Rocky Mountain Power in which both parties promised to work together to develop clean-energy projects that would enable Salt Lake City to meet its clean energy goals.

Biskupski also focused on finding long-term solutions for Salt Lake City's growing homeless population. In December 2016, the Mayor announced the creation of four new homeless shelters in the city. This generated controversy about where to put the shelters and the cost of land acquisition.

In 2017, Biskupski approved Salt Lake City's first "Transit Master Plan". This was designed to implement a frequent transit network (FTN), develop pilot programs and partnerships for employer shuttles and on-demand shared ride services, develop enhanced bus corridors, and implement a variety of transit-supportive programs and transit access improvements that overcome barriers to using transit.

In September 2018, Biskupski announced the formation of the Commission Against Gun Violence designed to explore policy questions regarding gun violence and to make funding recommendations to be shared with city, county and state officials, as well as the School District.

=== National Leadership ===
In 2018, Biskupski was involved in the U.S. Olympic Committee selecting Salt Lake City to bid on behalf of the United States for the 2030 Winter Games.

Biskupski served as co-chair of Sierra Club's Mayors for 100% Clean Energy.

In August 2018, Salt Lake City was selected to host the 68th United Nations Civil Society Conference, the first time a UN conference took place in the United States outside of New York City.

On November 19, 2018, Biskupski led a group of 21 mayors and council members from around Utah in submitting two amicus briefs with the U.S. District Court for the District of Columbia supporting the cases challenging President Trump's decisions to shrink Grand Staircase–Escalante (GSE) and Bears Ears National Monuments. The two cases, The Wilderness Society, et al. v. Donald J. Trump and Hopi Tribe, et al. v. Donald J. Trump, will be heard in the D.C. Court after a federal judge denied the Trump Administration's attempt to have the cases moved to the Utah District Court in Salt Lake City.

In June 2017, Biskupski lead Sierra Club's "Mayors for 100% Clean Energy," and joined with the Sierra Club's "Ready for 100" campaign in a new effort to engage and recruit mayors to endorse the goal of transitioning to 100% renewable energy in cities throughout the country.

In June 2017, Mayor Biskupski joined 61 U.S. mayors in committing to adopt, honor, and uphold the Paris Climate Agreement goals.

In 2017, the U.S. Conference of Mayors made Biskupski Vice Chairwoman of Mayors/Business Alliance for a Sustainable Future.

In February 2018, Mayor Biskupski joined hundreds of mayors opposing Clean Power Plan repeal.

In July 2019, United States Conference of Mayors formally adopted Resolution 66 introduced by Biskupski, urging congressional action to combat the impact of climate change through a national price on carbon emissions.

In what was regarded to be a surprise, Biskupski announced on March 16, 2019, that she would not be seeking a second term in the 2019 mayoral election, citing a "serious and complex family situation".

=== Environment ===
Biskupski served as co-chair of Sierra Club's Mayors for 100% Clean Energy.

In 2016, Salt Lake City became the 16th city in the United States to formally adopt a 100% clean energy plan.

In 2016, Biskupski created Salt Lake City's Department of Economic Development. In July 2016, the department become an official part of city government. Since its creation, the department has been responsible for attracting or expanding 29 companies in Salt Lake City, resulting in $895,000,000 of capital investment and 9,000 jobs.

In May 2016, Biskupski and Rocky Mountain Power CEO Cindy Crane launched a new initiative to double Salt Lake City's use of clean solar power. Their program, Subscriber Solar, increased the amount of sustainable energy powering government operations from 6% to 12% in 2016, in line with Biskupski's 2020 goal to have 50% of municipal operations powered by renewable energy, and 100% by 2032.

In July 2016, Biskupski launched Climate Positive 2040, Salt Lake City's initiative to transition the community to 100% renewable energy sources by 2032 (adjusted to 2030 in 2019) and to reduce carbon emissions city-wide by 80% by 2040.

In keeping with Salt Lake City's clean energy goals set by Biskupski, in 2018, the Salt Lake City Fire Department made history by opening the first two net-zero fire stations in the country.

On February 13, 2019, Biskupski called on Utah's D.C. delegation to leave America's Clean Car Standards alone. Biskupski spoke against the rollbacks being worked by the United States Environmental Protection Agency (EPA) and the first Trump administration.

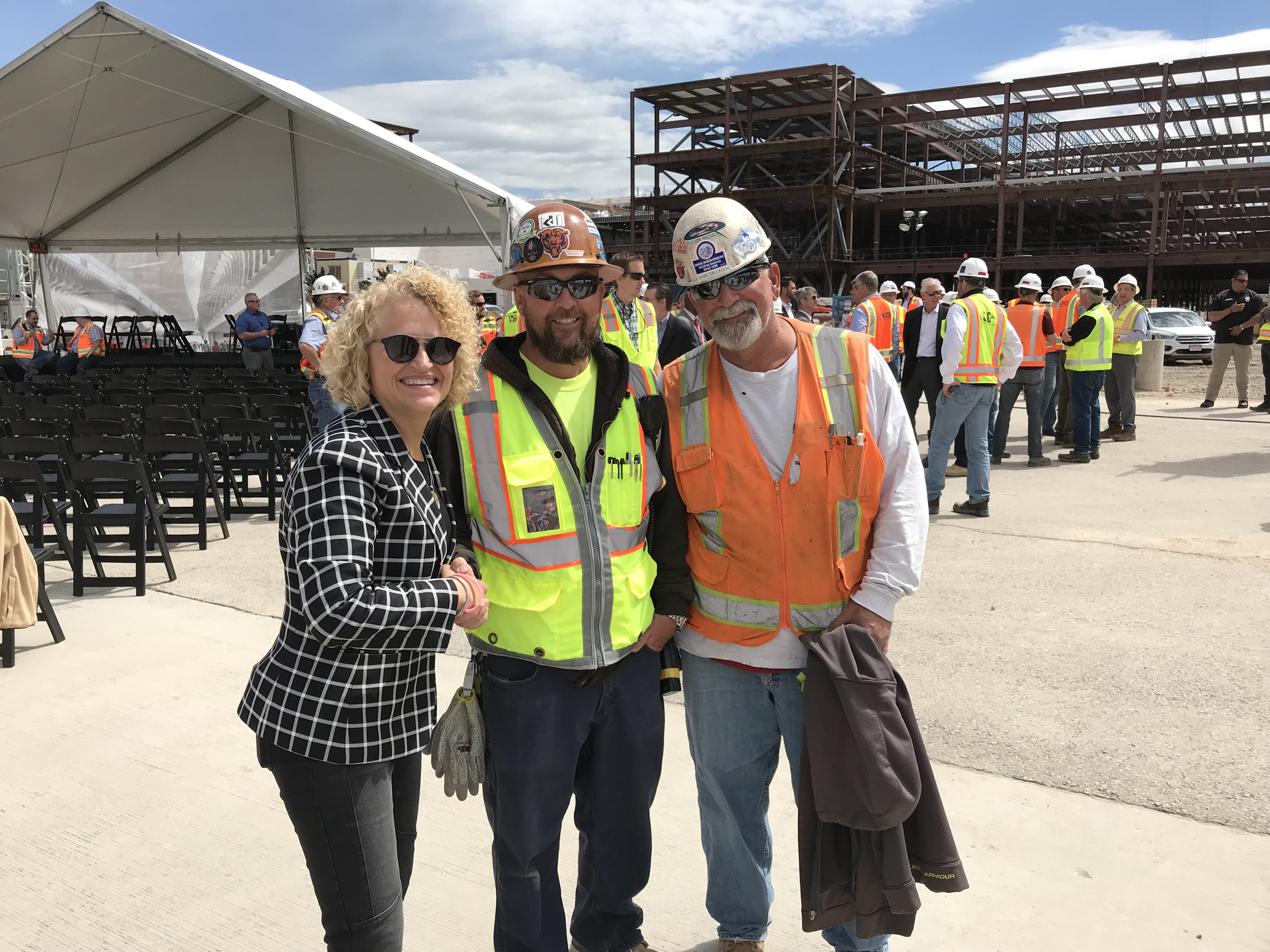
Biskupski at the Salt Lake City International Airport

=== Housing ===
On December 12, 2017, the Salt Lake City Council voted unanimously to adopt Biskupski's Growing SLC, a housing plan for the city.

In February 2017, Biskupski launched the city's first affordable housing plan in 20 years. GrowingSLC, from 2017 to 2022, laid out a plan for policy changes, investment, and direct action to create and preserve affordable housing in Salt Lake City. Since 2017, the city has increased the number of units in the city's affordable housing pipeline from 200 in 2016 to more than 2,000 today.

=== Transportation ===
Biskupski created partnerships between Salt Lake City and dockless scooter companies, Lime and Bird to increase transit use by people who live more than a quarter of a mile from the bus or TRAX.

In August 2019, from funding from a .05% increase in sales-tax, Salt Lake City launched the first phase of the city's "Transit Master Plan". Three frequent transit network lines were opened on 900 South, 200 South, and 2100 South.

=== Infrastructure ===
Under Biskupski's leadership, Salt Lake City's International Airport is being entirely rebuilt to create the nation's first 21st-century hub airport, a $3.6-billion-dollar project that does not use a single taxpayer dollar.

In November 2018, Salt Lake City voters approved Biskupski's $87-million bond for road repair.

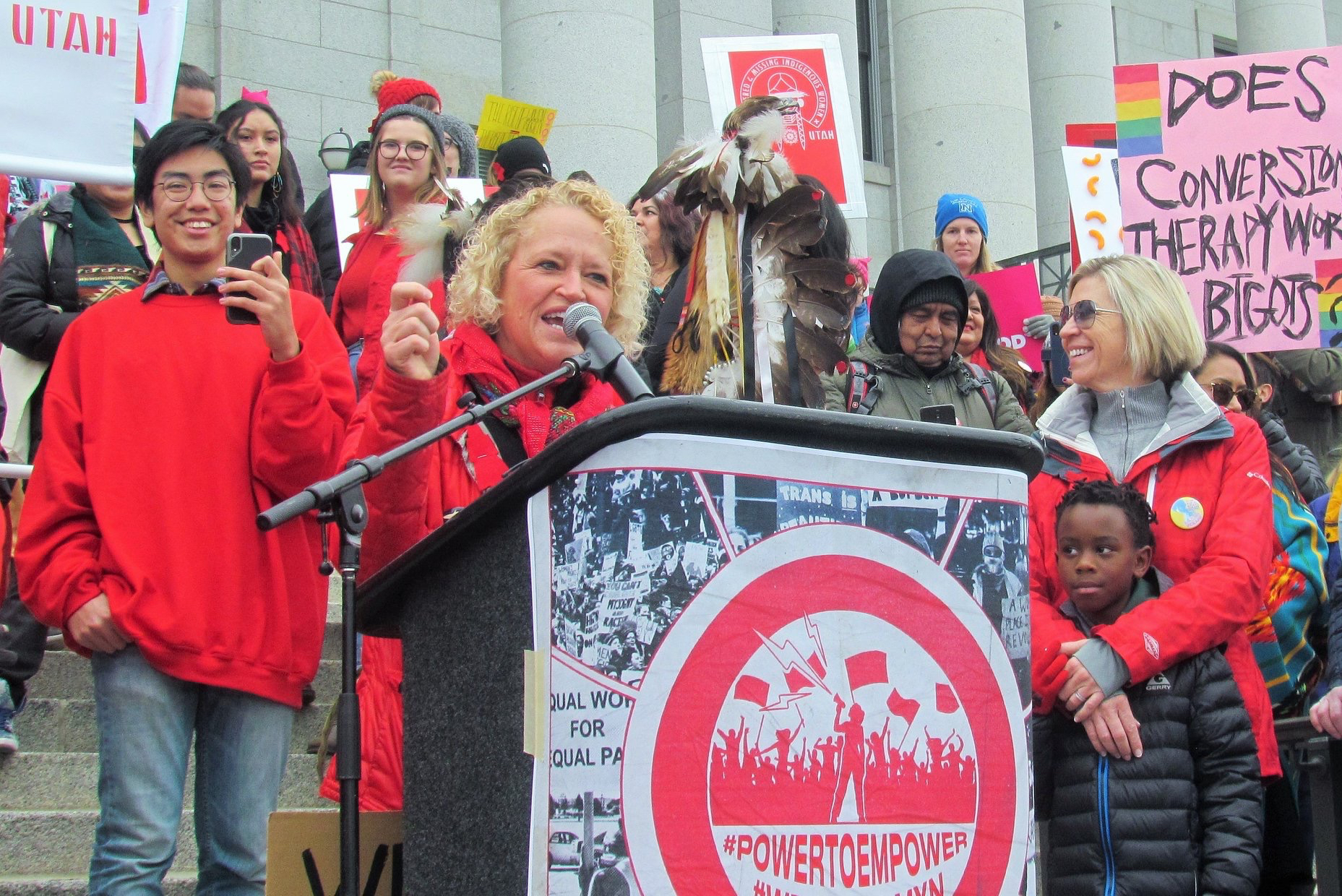
Biskupski speaking at the 2019 Women's March in January 2019

=== Gender equality ===
In January 2017, in a first of its kind for the State of Utah, Biskupski issued new city policy providing 6 weeks of paid parental leave for any employee of Salt Lake City government, extending the benefit to recently hired mothers, fathers, and those who become parents through adoption or foster care. Salt Lake County followed Salt Lake City shortly after.

On March 1, 2018, Biskupski signed Salt Lake City's gender pay equity policy which aimed to eliminate systemic bias and discrimination that adds to the under valuation of work performed by women it requires human resources to conduct regular audits on gender pay equity and specifically, the policy prohibits individuals participating in city hiring processes from asking an applicant about their current or past salary history.

At the 2019 Salt Lake City Women's March, Biskupski called on Utah to ratify the Equal Rights Amendment, which would enshrine gender equality in the U.S. Constitution.

=== Utah Inland Port ===
Biskupski has been a vocal opponent of the Utah Inland Port in its current legal state. Issues cited by Biskupski include loss of local control of the land, lack of transparency in the decision-making process, and environmental disruption.

On March 11, 2019, Biskupski directed the Salt Lake City's Attorney's Office to bring a lawsuit against the port, challenging the legality of the legislation underlying the port's creation.

=== Public Safety ===
In April 2016, Biskupski announced a plan to restructure SLC911, including addressing staffing issues. By November 2016, numbers show an 84% decrease in mandatory overtime shifts.

In October 2017, Biskupski issued an executive order directing the release of police body-worn camera footage within 10 days of a critical incident.

In 2018, under Biskupski's leadership, the Salt Lake City Police Department experienced a three-year, 25% decrease in crime citywide.

In July 2019, Biskupski unveiled new wheelchair lift trailers to expand emergency services response by police and fire departments.

=== Public Art ===
In April 2017, Biskupski inaugurated 18 permanent public art sculptures in downtown Salt Lake City.

In February 2018, Biskupski launched the "Arts for All" program which provides eligible residents the opportunity to receive up to four free tickets per year to select performances at the Eccles Theater. To be eligible to enter the ticket drawing, residents must receive Supplemental Nutrition Assistance Program (SNAP) benefits or be eligible for free or reduced school lunches.

In August 2019, Biskupski completed ColorSLC, the largest public art project in SLC history.

== Voting record: Utah Legislature ==
Biskupski's voting record: 2006–2011 Utah Legislature
Date	Bill No.	Bill Title	Outcome	Vote
Jan. 26, 2006	HB 109	Sales and Use Tax on Food	Passed - House	Y
Jan. 27, 2006	1SHB 85	Parental Consent for Minors Abortion Bill	Passed - House	N
Feb. 9, 2006	1SHB 10	Dating Violence Protective Orders Bill	House	Co-Sponsor
Feb. 13, 2006	1SHB 10	Dating Violence Protective Orders Bill	Failed - House	Y
Feb. 20, 2006	HB 329	Big Game Hunting Age	Passed - House	N
Feb. 20, 2006	1SHB 107	Full-Day Kindergarten	Passed-House	Y
Feb. 22, 2006	1SHB 181	Education Reform Bill	Passed - House	N
Feb. 27, 2006	3SSB 96	Origin of Species Curriculum Requirement Bill	Failed - House	N
Feb. 28, 2006	1SSB 19	Additions to Smoking Ban	Passed - House	N
March 1, 2006	3SHB 109	Food Tax Cut	Concurrence Vote Passed - House	Y
March 1, 2006	2SSB 19	Additions to Smoking Ban	Conference Report Adopted - House	Y
May 24, 2006	2SHB 3001	2006-2007 Transportation Budget Amendments	Conference Report Adopted - House	Y
Jan. 31, 2007	HB 224	Repeal of Exemptions from Nonresident Tuition	Motion Rejected - House	N
Feb. 2, 2007	HB 148	Parent Choice in Education Act	Passed - House	N
Feb. 12, 2007	2SHB 235	Abortion Law Revisions	Passed - House	N
Feb. 21, 2007	4SHB 236	Student Clubs Amendments	Concurrence Vote Passed - House	N
Dec. 20, 2007	HB 85	Teacher Home Loan Program	House	Co-Sponsor
Feb. 1, 2008	HB 237	Immigration Enforcement	Passed - House	N
Feb. 4, 2008	HR 1	North American Union Withdrawal	Passed - House	N
Feb. 5, 2008	HB 85	Teacher Home Loan Program	Passed - House	Y
Feb. 11, 2008	HB 239	Driver's License Requirements	Passed - House	N
Feb. 12, 2008	HB 241	Restricting In-State Tuition Eligibility	Passed - House	N
Feb. 12, 2008	HB 137	Water Conservation Program	Failed - House	Y
Feb. 15, 2008	HB 75	State Inventory of Government Activities	Passed - House	N
Feb. 18, 2008	HB 295	Policies for Electronic Devices at School	Failed - House	Y
March 3, 2008	SB 81	Expanding Immigration Enforcement	Passed - House	N
March 4, 2008	SB 297	Increasing Penalties for Animal Cruelty	Passed - House	Y
March 4, 2008	SB 211	Amending Alcohol Regulations	Passed - House	N
March 5, 2008	SB 299	Domestic Partnership Benefits	Passed - House	N
March 5, 2008	SB 149	Expanding Minimum Automotive Insurance Coverage	Passed - House	Y
March 5, 2008	HB 359	Tax Law Amendments	Passed - House	N
March 5, 2008	HB 15	Sexually Transmitted Disease Education	Passed - House	Y
Jan. 26, 2009	HB 17	Allowing Doctors to Prescribe Antibiotics to Unnamed Sexual Partners	House	Co-Sponsor
Jan. 29, 2009	HB 17	Allowing Doctors to Prescribe Antibiotics to Unnamed Sexual Partners	Passed - House	Y
Feb. 3, 2009	HB 90	Increasing Illegal Abortion Penalty	Passed - House	N
Feb. 5, 2009	SB 25	Online Voter Registration	Passed - House	Y
Feb. 5, 2009	SB 16	Prohibiting "Gang Loitering"	Passed - House	N
Feb. 10, 2009	HB 345	Regulating Former Lawmakers in Lobbying	House	Co-Sponsor
Feb. 18, 2009	HB 122	Restricting Access to Government Litigation Records	Passed - House	Y
March 4, 2009	SB 29	Authorizing Corporate Water Systems to Refuse Fluoridation	Passed - House	N
March 4, 2009	HJR 8	Mandating Secret Ballots	Passed - House	N
March 5, 2009	HB 179	Authorizing Land Swap for Development of UTA Rail Station	Passed - House	N
March 9, 2009	HB 379	Environmental Lawsuit Delay Bond	Passed - House	N
March 9, 2009	HB 171	Extending CHIP and Medicaid Coverage to Children of Documented Immigrants	Passed - House	Y
March 10, 2009	SB 79	Elevating Standard of Proof for Specific Medical Malpractice Lawsuits	Passed - House	N
March 10, 2009	SB 53	Prohibiting the Awarding of Legal Fees to Plaintiffs in Public Interest Lawsuits	Passed - House	N
March 11, 2009	SB 48	Amending Requirements for Obtaining Teaching Licenses	Failed - House	N
March 11, 2009	SB 208	Posting Public Notices Online	Passed - House	N
March 11, 2009	SB 187	Alcohol Law Amendments	Passed - House	Y
March 12, 2009	SJR 14	Legislative Regulation of Death Row Appeals	Joint Resolution Failed - House	N
March 12, 2009	HB 290	Prohibiting Text Messaging While Driving	Concurrence Vote Passed - House	Y
Feb. 8, 2010	HB 18	Expanding Unemployment Insurance Eligibility	Passed - House	Y
Feb. 10, 2010	SB 11	Federal Arms Regulation Exemption	Passed - House	N
Feb. 16, 2010	HCR 8	Statement of Opposition to Federal Health Care Proposal	Passed - House	N
Feb. 24, 2010	SB 55	Authorizing Higher Education Institutions to Authorize Charter Schools	Passed - House	N
Feb. 24, 2010	HB 227	Lawful Presence Documentation Requirement for Business Licensing	Passed - House	N
March 11, 2010	SB 251	Requiring Businesses Utilize Federal E-Verify Program	Passed - House	N
Jan. 26, 2011	HB 219	Official State Gun Designation	Passed - House	Y
Feb. 16, 2011	HB 75	Guns On School Premises	Passed - House	N
Feb. 18, 2011	HB 70	Identifying Undocumented Immigrants	Passed - House	N
Feb. 25, 2011	HB 155	Cycling Law Amendments	Passed - House	Y
March 9, 2011	SB 73	Public School Teacher Tenure Modifications	Passed - House	N
May 6, 2011	HB 328	Transportation Funding Revisions	Veto-Override Passed-House	N

Political offices
Preceded by Ralph Becker	Mayor of Salt Lake City; 2016–2020	Succeeded by Erin Mendenhall
