= Brian Doughty =

American politician

Member of the Utah House of Representatives from the 30th district
- In office July 20, 2011 – 2013
- Preceded by: Jackie Biskupski

Personal details
- Party: Democratic
- Occupation: Small business owner

Brian Doughty is a former member of the Utah House of Representatives, representing the 30th District in Salt Lake County. He was selected on July 16, 2011, by local Democratic delegates to replace state representative Jackie Biskupski, who had resigned when she moved out of the district. He was sworn in on July 20, 2011.

In the redistricting process that followed the 2010 census, Doughty's home was placed in the 26th district, along with that of House Minority Leader David Litvack. A contested Democratic primary between the two incumbents seemed to be on the cards until, in March 2012, Litvack announced that he would retire rather than seek re-election. Doughty lost his bid for re-election in the new district at the Salt Lake County Convention.

Doughty is openly gay and previously served on the board of Equality Utah.
