= Frank R. Pignanelli =

American politician

Minority Leader of the Utah House of Representatives
- In office 1991–1996
- Preceded by: Mike Dmitrich
- Succeeded by: Dave Jones

Minority Whip of the Utah House of Representatives
- In office 1989–1990
- Preceded by: Blaze Wharton
- Succeeded by: Kelly Atkinson

Member of the Utah House of Representatives from the 24th district
- In office January 1, 1993 – January 1, 1997
- Preceded by: Paula Julander
- Succeeded by: Ralph Becker

Member of the Utah House of Representatives from the 23rd district
- In office January 1, 1987 – January 1, 1993
- Preceded by: Robert B. Sykes
- Succeeded by: Pete Suazo

Personal details
- Party: Democratic

Frank R. Pignanelli is an American politician who served in the Utah House of Representatives from 1987 through 1997, serving as minority leader and minority whip for parts of that tenure. In 2003, he, unsuccessfully, ran for mayor of Salt Lake City.

== Early life ==
Pignanelli is a native Utah resident, growing up in Salt Lake City.

In high school, Pignanelli partook in competitive debate.

He received a Juris Doctor degree from the University of Utah College of Law. Before being elected to the Utah House of Representatives, he was a lawyer at the Salt Lake City law firm Gustin, Adams, Kasting & Liapis. He was also the treasurer of the Salt Lake County Democratic Party and the chairman of the finance committee for the Young Lawyers Section of the Utah State Bar. In 1985, he was the campaign manager for Sydney Fonnesbeck's successful Salt Lake City Council campaign.

== Utah House of Representatives ==
In 1986, he was elected to the Utah House of Representatives' 23rd district. He was reelected to the district in 1988 and 1990. In 1992 he was redistricted, and was elected to the 24th district. He would win reelection to this district in 1994.

In November 1988, the Utah House of Representatives' Democratic caucus voted to make Pignanelli its party whip for the then-upcoming 1989–1990 session, thus, selecting him to be the minority whip.

In 1990, he was elected to the 24th district of the Utah House. He would be reelected to it.

In late 1990, the Utah House of Representatives' Democratic caucus voted to make Pignanelli its party leader for the then-upcoming 1991–1992 session, thus, selecting him to serve as the minority leader. He would retain this position through the 1995–1996 session.

== Subsequent career ==
In 2003, he unsuccessfully ran for mayor of Salt Lake City.

Pignanelli is a partner at Salt Lake City based government relations firm Foxley & Pignanelli.

He writes a weekly political column for the Deseret News.

He currently serves as the Executive Director of the National Association of Industrial Bankers to champion innovative financial services for Americans by expanding access to credit, guaranteeing consumer choice, and providing unique banking services.
