= Jim Dabakis =

American politician

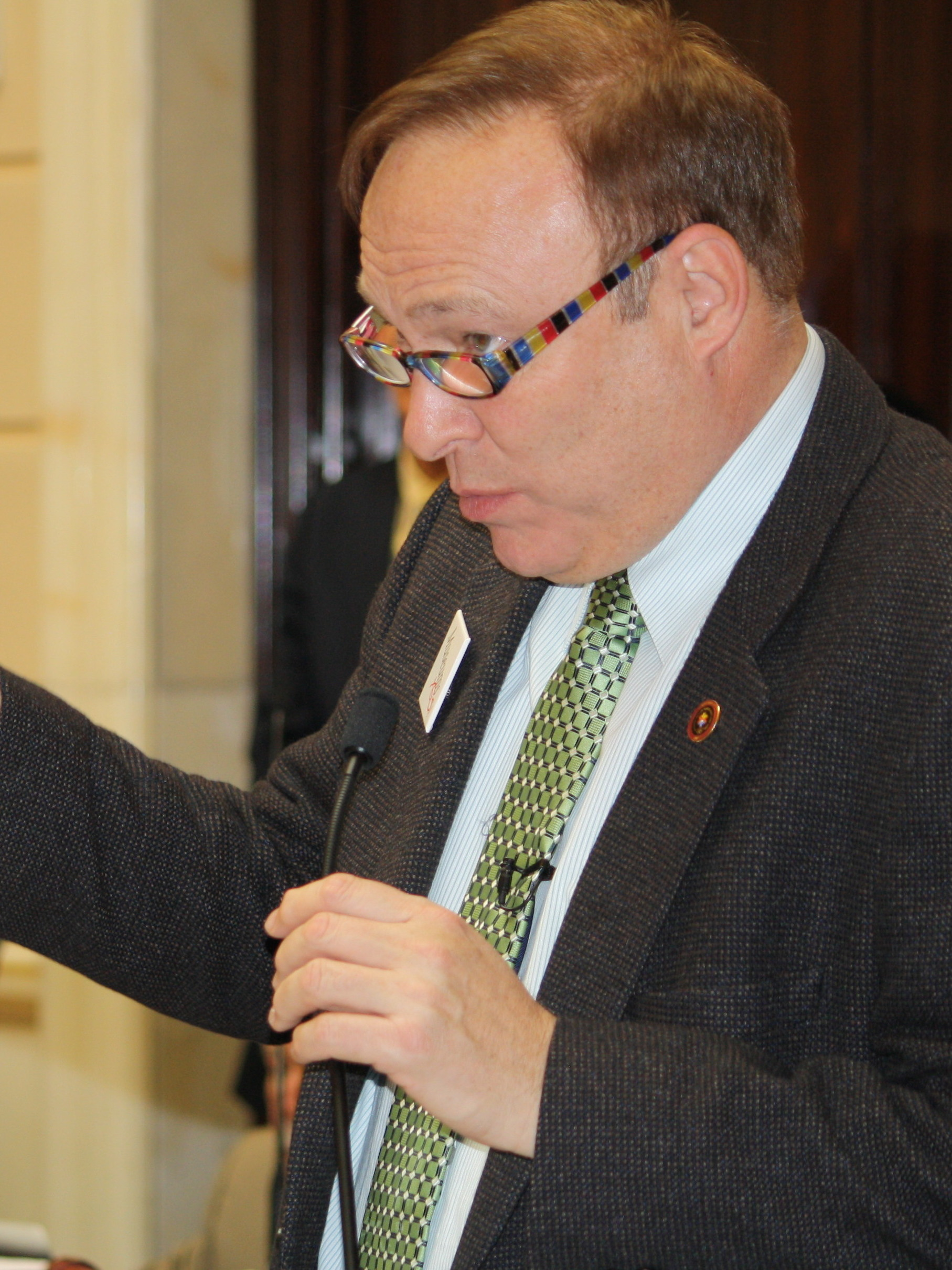
- Dabakis in 2013

Member of the Utah State Senate from the 2nd district
- In office December 2012 – January 2019
- Preceded by: Ben McAdams
- Succeeded by: Derek Kitchen

Chair of the Utah Democratic Party
- In office July 2011 – March 2014
- Preceded by: Wayne Holland
- Succeeded by: Peter Corroon

Personal details
- Born: 1953 or 1954 (age 71–72)
- Party: Democratic (until 2020); Republican (2020-present) (Note: Dabakis encouraged registered non-Republicans in Utah to register as Republicans in order to vote in the Republican gubernatorial primary.)
- Spouse: Stephen Justesen

Jim Dabakis is an American politician from Salt Lake City, Utah. While now a Republican for primary voting purposes, he served as a member of the Utah State Senate as a Democrat, where he represented the state's 2nd senate district.

== Early life, education, and career ==
Born into a Greek-American family from Springfield, Massachusetts, Dabakis is the son of a machinist. Raised Greek Orthodox, he was baptized into the Church of Jesus Christ of Latter-day Saints at age 11. In 1971, he enrolled at Brigham Young University and sought guidance from Mark E. Petersen, one of the Church's apostles, about his homosexuality. He was sent to the San Francisco bay area as a missionary.

Dabakis dropped out of BYU, and later became a talk-radio and TV host in Salt Lake City. He also organized tours of the Eastern Bloc. In 1991, he moved to Saint Petersburg, Russia, where he taught business at a Russian university, developed an art business and provided micro-loans to a variety of emerging Russian entrepreneurs. He split his time between Salt Lake City and St. Petersburg over the next twenty years. His official web page lists his profession as art dealer. He is also the host of a local TV show in Salt Lake City called UP with Jim Dabakis.

One of the co-founders of Equality Utah and the Utah Pride Center, Dabakis is openly gay. On June 26, 2013, he proposed marriage to Stephen Justeson. The two were legally wed by Salt Lake City Mayor Ralph Becker at the Salt Lake County Clerk's Office on December 20, 2013, just hours after a federal judge ruled the state's same-sex marriage ban unconstitutional.

== Political career ==
Senator Dabakis started his political career when he co-founded the Utah Pride Center and Equality Utah. He works closely with both of these organizations. Dabakis was elected chair of the Utah Democratic Party in July 2011. He has made outreach to Mormons a focus of his tenure at the head of the party. In 2014, Dabakis stepped down as state party chair for health reasons and to spend more time with his husband, Stephen.

Dabakis was appointed to the Utah Senate by Democratic delegates in December 2012, following the election of senator Ben McAdams to the mayoralty of Salt Lake County. Five candidates sought the senate appointment, with Dabakis besting Peter Corroon, the outgoing mayor of Salt Lake County, by a vote of 67 to 61 in the final round of balloting. Senator Dabakis won reelection in 2014.

Senator Dabakis has his own caucus, called the Dabakis Kakis. He holds weekly meetings to keep people updated on the legislative session. He also has a blog during the legislative session: dabakisdiary.wordpress.com.

During the 2016 Legislative Session, Senator Dabakis served on the following committees:

- Senate Education Committee
- Senate Revenue and Taxation Committee
- Senate Rules Committee

In October 2015, Dabakis started a TV show and a PAC for liberals in Utah called Utah Progressives. The UP website went offline in late 2016, and redirected to Damn Dabakis in 2017.

He unsuccessfully ran in the 2019 Salt Lake City mayoral election.

== Legislation ==
=== 2016 sponsored bills ===
Bill number	Bill title	Bill status
SB98	Arts and Cultural Education Spending	Senate/ Filed for bills not passed 3/10/2016
SB104	Amendments to Tax Income	Senate/ Filed for bills not passed 3/10/2016
SB141	Alcohol Amendments	Senate/ Filed for bills not passed 3/10/2016
SB170	Indigenous Peoples Day	Senate/ Filed for bills not passed 3/10/2016
SB198	Amendments Related to Deferred Deposit Lending	Senate/ Filed for bills not passed 3/10/2016
SB207	Government Ethics - Post-Employment Restrictions	Senate/ Filed for bills not passed 3/10/2016
SB240	Public Accommodations Amendments	Senate/ Filed for bills not passed 3/10/2016
SB241	Public Accommodation Fairness Act	Senate/ Filed for bills not passed 3/10/2016
SJR4	Proposal to Amend Utah Constitution - Education Funding	Senate/ Filed for bills not passed 3/10/2016

=== Notable legislation ===
Senator Dabakis sponsored bill SB141 in 2016, which sought to alter one of Utah's peculiar liquor laws, specifically it would remove Zion Curtains from restaurants. The bill was held in committee and did not pass.
