= Rocky Anderson =

American attorney and politician (born 1951)

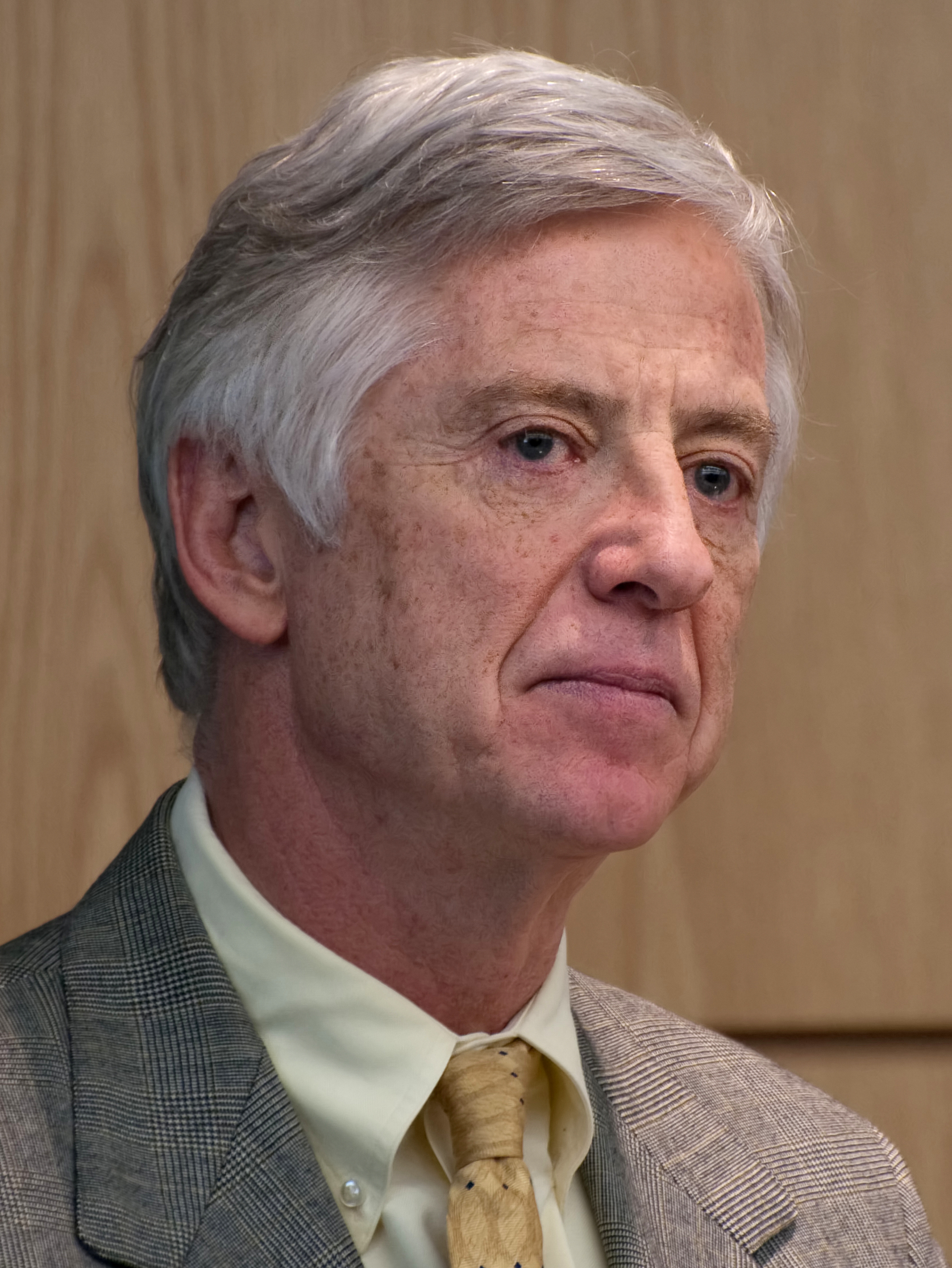
- Anderson in 2009

33rd Mayor of Salt Lake City
- In office January 3, 2000 – January 7, 2008
- Preceded by: Deedee Corradini
- Succeeded by: Ralph Becker

Personal details
- Born: Ross Carl Anderson II; September 9, 1951 (age 75) Logan, Utah, U.S.
- Party: Democratic (before 2012, 2022–present)
- Other political affiliations: Justice (2012–2022)
- Education: University of Utah (BA); George Washington University (JD)

Ross Carl "Rocky" Anderson II (born September 9, 1951) is an American attorney, writer, activist, and civil and human rights advocate. He served two terms as the 33rd Mayor of Salt Lake City, Utah, from 2000 to 2008.

Prior to serving as mayor, Anderson practiced law for 21 years in Salt Lake City, during which he was the 1996 Democratic nominee for Congress in Utah's Second Congressional District. Following his terms as mayor, Anderson founded and served as the Executive Director of High Road for Human Rights and returned to his legal practice, frequently bringing legal challenges to government programs. Anderson also served as the 2012 presidential nominee for his newly created Justice Party, receiving 43,000 votes out of more than 129 million votes cast. Anderson ran again for mayor of Salt Lake City in the 2023 mayoral election, but he lost to incumbent Erin Mendenhall 58% to 34%.

== Early life and education ==
Ross C. "Rocky" Anderson was born in Logan, Utah, one of three children of Roy and Grace Anderson. His parents both worked at Anderson Lumber Company, a local lumber yard founded by Rocky's great-grandfather, a Norwegian immigrant carpenter who had converted to the Church of Jesus Christ of Latter-day Saints (LDS Church).

Though Anderson does not currently consider himself to be a Mormon, he was raised as one and was a practicing member of the LDS Church in Logan. He has described his disagreement with certain doctrines of the LDS Church, particularly the denial of the priesthood to men of black African descent and the denial to Black men and women of the right to engage in religious ceremonies prior to 1978. Anderson has likewise expressed his disagreement with the LDS Church's teachings and policies relating to members of the LGBTQ+ community. Anderson also expresses disagreement with what he describes as the LDS teaching of personal moral abdication through obedience to people in positions of authority, arguing that it violates the principle of personal conscience and individual moral development and accountability.

Amidst a wide variety of courses, Anderson studied ethics, political philosophy, and religious philosophy at the University of Utah.

During high school, Anderson played lead guitar in a rock and roll band, the Viscounts, and worked at a cabinet and roof truss plant. He also shingled roofs during his high school and college years. After graduating from Ogden High School, Anderson attended the University of Utah, during which time he served as Treasurer for the Beta Epsilon chapter of Sigma Chi fraternity and worked at various jobs, including as a truck driver, a roofer, and a gas station manager. He earned a bachelor's degree in philosophy, graduating magna cum laude. After reading existentialist literature and several works on ethics, religious philosophy, and political philosophy, he had a "powerful epiphany. We can't escape responsibility, there's no sitting out moral decisions, and whenever we refuse to stand up against wrongdoing we're actually supporting the status quo."

After graduating from the University of Utah, Anderson worked at several jobs. He built buck fence at a ranch in Wyoming, tended bar in Salt Lake City, drove a cab, waited tables at a restaurant, worked at a methadone clinic, typed freight bills, and worked in construction.

He started graduate school in philosophy at the University of Utah, then traveled to Europe and lived and worked for a few months in Freiburg, Germany before returning to the United States to attend law school. In 1978, Anderson graduated, with honors, from George Washington University Law School, earning his Juris Doctor.

== Career ==
=== Law practice ===
Upon graduation from law school, Anderson returned to Salt Lake City to practice law. He participated in several jury trials in federal and state courts and handled appeals before the Utah Court of Appeals, the Utah Supreme Court, the United States District Court for the District of Utah (in an appeal from Bankruptcy Court) and the U.S. Court of Appeals for the Tenth Circuit. Anderson had an extremely diverse legal practice and represented plaintiffs in dozens of major cases, involving a wide variety of issues, including securities fraud, violation of church and state separation, civil rights, professional malpractice, abuse of incarcerated people, child sex abuse, and First and Fourth Amendment violations.

Before he was elected Mayor of Salt Lake City, Anderson practiced law for twenty-one years in Salt Lake City, beginning as an associate with Berman & Giauque and later as a partner in Berman & Anderson; Hansen & Anderson; Anderson & Watkins; and Anderson & Karrenberg. After he returned to the practice of law in 2014, he was of counsel with Winder & Counsel, then was a partner at Lewis Hansen, and then practiced at Law Offices of Rocky Anderson until 2021, when he wound down his law practice and volunteered full-time as Executive Director of the Justice Party (later named Allied Justice). He specialized in civil litigation in several areas of law, including antitrust, securities fraud, commercial, product liability, professional malpractice and civil rights. He often represented individuals suing corporations or government entities, including plaintiffs in the following cases:

- Bradford v. Moench: A consumer rights lawsuit in which Anderson successfully asserted a novel securities law theory and achieved, in a precedent-setting decision, broad protections for depositors in inadequately insured "thrift and loan" companies.
- Scott v. Hammock: A lawsuit in which Anderson represented a young woman who had been sexually abused by her adoptive father. During the case, Anderson challenged the right of confidentiality that the L.D.S Church asserted regarding non-penitential communications by the defendant with his Mormon bishop.
- University of Utah Students Against Apartheid v. Peterson: A case in which plaintiffs successfully asserted their First Amendment rights to symbolic speech after the university administration ordered them to remove shanties used to protest the university's investments in South Africa. (Anderson filed an amicus brief for the ACLU in the case.)
- Armstrong v. McCotter: A civil rights case involving a young mentally ill man, Michael Valent, who, while incarcerated in prison, died from a pulmonary embolism after being strapped naked in a restraint chair for 16 hours solely because of conduct linked to his schizophrenia.
- Bott v. Deland: A civil rights case based upon deliberate indifference toward and unnecessarily rigorous treatment of an incarcerated person with a severe medical problem. The case established, for the first time, protections for the rights of incarcerated people under the Utah Constitution far broader than under the United States Constitution. In that case, the Utah Supreme Court agreed that financial damages, not limited by state statute, are available for violations of the protections provided for incarcerated people under the State Constitution.
- Regan v. Salt Lake County: A class action challenging invasive searches, including strip searches, of women held on minor violations at the Salt Lake County Jail.
- Prettyman v. Salt Lake City: A civil rights case involving the excessive use of force by police, resulting in the breaking of a rod in the plaintiff's back.
- Harding v. Walles: A civil rights case involving the sexual abuse of a male prison inmate by a prison guard.
- Mitchell v. Roberts: A child sex abuse case, seeking to protect the right, created by the Utah Legislature, to sue a perpetrator even if the prior statute of limitations had already run.
- Cinema Pub v. Petilos: Successfully vindicated the First Amendment rights of a local theater that serves alcohol after the Utah D.A.B.C. sought to sanction the business for showing the movie Deadpool.
- Kendall v. Olsen: Sought justice regarding the warrantless invasion of a private backyard by a police officer who unjustifiably shot and killed the resident's beloved dog.

Anderson helped to spearhead the reform of Utah's child custody laws. He worked to institute a program to help those who do not qualify for assistance through Legal Aid or Legal Services, but who are unable to afford to pay in full for legal representation. Anderson served as Chair of the Litigation Section of the Utah State Bar Association (when the Litigation Section was recognized by the Utah Bar Association as the Section of the Year), and as president of Anderson and Karrenberg, a Salt Lake City law firm.

=== Volunteer work with non-profit organizations and activism. ===
When he was practicing law, Anderson was affiliated with several non-profit organizations dedicated to protecting civil rights, providing educational opportunities for economically disadvantaged children, protecting reproductive freedom, improving the penal and criminal justice systems, and strengthening legislative ethics. He served as president of the boards of the ACLU of Utah, Guadalupe Schools, and Citizens for Penal Reform, which he founded. He served as a board member of several other community-based non-profit organizations, including Planned Parenthood Association of Utah (for whom he also performed pro bono legal services, including a successful lawsuit to obtain an occupancy certificate for a new clinic, which had been denied because of community opposition to a family planning clinic) and Utah Common Cause. On behalf of Common Cause, Anderson lobbied for stronger legislation pertaining to ethical conduct by elected officials, as well as for campaign finance reform.

While he was practicing law, Anderson opposed the Reagan Administration's efforts to overthrow the government in Nicaragua and some of the Administration's other policies relating to Latin America. He spoke publicly and debated regarding the U.S.'s illegal intervention in Nicaragua and organized two trips to Nicaragua for dozens of Utahns so they could see, and report back to the public, what was actually happening in the country. He also twice debated the commander-in-chief of the Contras, Adolfo Calero.

Moved by the suffering of the friends and family members of several women who had been murdered in the Salt Lake City area, but whose killings Salt Lake City police detectives had failed to solve, Anderson worked pro bono for many months, reviewing documents and locating and interviewing witnesses. His work, together with the efforts of others, led to the eventual grand jury indictment and conviction of a man for one of the murders.

Rocky served as Chair of the Board of Salt Lake Academy of Music (SLAM) and now serves on the Board of the Haitian Orchestra Institute (HOI).

=== 1996 congressional campaign ===
After winning a contentious primary election against Kelly Atkinson by a margin of 11%, Anderson ran for Congress as the Democratic nominee in Utah's 2nd congressional district in 1996 against Republican Merrill Cook. Without any financial help from the Democratic Party (some local Democratic leaders viewed Anderson as being too liberal because of his work with the ACLU, his advocacy for reproductive rights, his support for same-sex marriage, his opposition to U.S. policy toward Nicaragua in the 1980s, and his opposition to the death penalty), he garnered over 100,000 votes in the district. Anderson lost the 1996 race to Merrill Cook, achieving 37 percent of the ballots cast versus Cook's 60 percent.

=== Mayor of Salt Lake City ===
Anderson ran for Mayor of Salt Lake City in 1999, defeating 10 other candidates in the primary campaign, before winning 60% of the vote in the general election against opponent Stuart Reid. He won re-election by an 8% margin against Frank R. Pignanelli in 2003.

Rocky II campaign sticker.

Anderson's two terms in office were extremely eventful, with Anderson playing a leading role in hosting the 2002 Winter Olympic Games. He organized and co-hosted dozens of mayors for three consecutive years at the Sundance Summit. He also founded the Salt Lake City International Jazz Festival, as well as providing national and international leadership regarding climate protection. He conducted a successful national campaign to require that airports across the country screen all checked luggage, expanded the area's light rail system, significantly expanded protected open space, implemented an innovative and highly successful restorative justice program and created a city wide after-school and summer youth program, YouthCity.

Many of Anderson's achievements were described in his State of the City addresses and listed by the news media shortly before he left office.

State Senator Chris Buttars of West Jordan publicly denounced former Mayor Rocky Anderson for having "attracted the entire gay community to come and live in Salt Lake County" after a Dan Jones poll indicated strong support for allowing domestic partnerships. In the 2004 election, 63% of the city population voted against banning same-sex marriage, in agreement with Mayor Anderson.

Anderson chose not to run for a third term so he could push for reforms of U.S. human rights policies and practices through grassroots organizing.

==== Environmental and climate protection programs ====
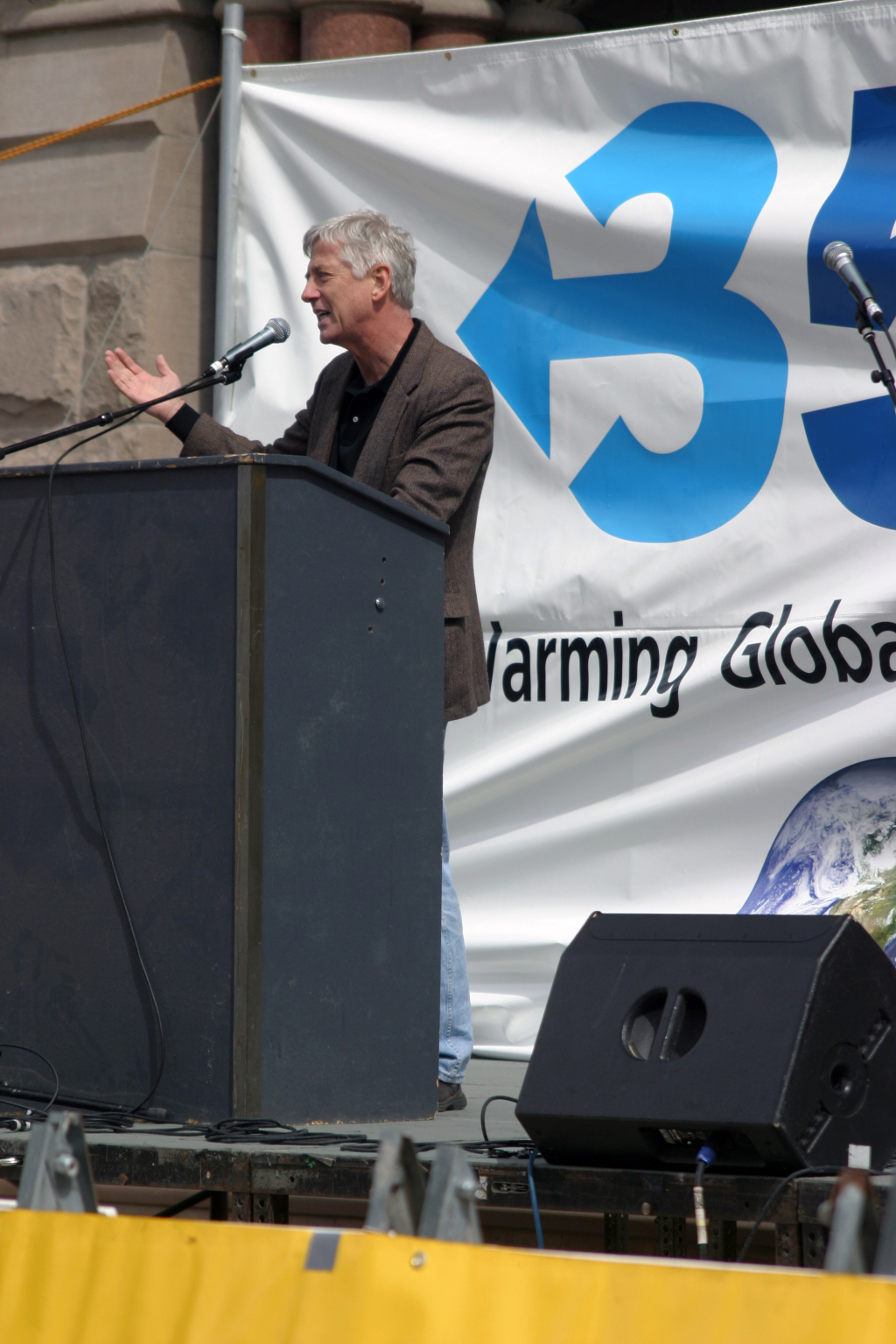
Anderson addressing a 350.org gathering on global warming awareness.

Considered perhaps the "greenest" mayor in the United States, Anderson gained international renown for his Salt Lake City Green Program – a comprehensive effort to improve sustainability and reduce the City's environmental footprint – which achieved a 31% reduction in greenhouse gas emissions from municipal operations in just 3 years. Elements of the program, which Anderson described as covering "everything from dog waste to nuclear wastes", included initiatives to improve the efficiency of the City's fleet and use of electricity, measures to make Salt Lake City more bicycle-and pedestrian-friendly, and co-generation plants at the City's landfill and wastewater treatment facilities that recapture methane to generate electricity.

As part of the Salt Lake City Green program, Anderson committed Salt Lake City to the Kyoto Protocol goals in 2002. He mandated that all city buildings use energy-efficient light bulbs and replaced SUVs in the city fleet with high-efficiency, alternative-fuel vehicles. Anderson almost doubled the city's recycling capacity in one year. The City surpassed its Kyoto goals in 2006, seven years ahead of schedule.

In 2003, Anderson received the Climate Protection Award from the United States Environmental Protection Agency, and the Sierra Club acknowledged his environmental work with its Distinguished Service Award. In November 2005, the Salt Lake City Green program led to Salt Lake City receiving the World Leadership Award for environmental programs, presented by the World Leadership Forum in London.

Anderson exemplified "green living" through personal example, including xeriscaping his entire yard, installing solar panels at his home, recycling all recyclable materials, and using cold-water detergent, fluorescent bulbs, thermostat timers and a natural gas-powered car.

While serving as mayor, Anderson informed and inspired other municipal officials about the importance of educating constituents about climate change and of taking measures to significantly reduce greenhouse gas emissions.

Anderson later researched, produced, and narrated a multi-media piece (still available on YouTube) regarding the need for tenacious, effective leadership to protect against further disastrous climate chaos.

For three consecutive years, he organized and co-hosted, with Robert Redford and ICLEI, The Sundance Summit: A Mayors Gathering on Climate Protection, attended by dozens of mayors from throughout the United States. At the Sundance Summit, mayors learned the science of climate change, how to communicate regarding the causes, consequences, and solutions to climate change, and best practices in cities implementing ground-breaking climate protection practices.

Anderson also spoke on the subject of the climate crisis at side meetings at United Nations Conference of the Parties (COP) meetings in New Delhi, Buenos Aires, and Bali, and at conferences in Sweden, Australia, and across the United States. Anderson also spoke in Beijing to a gathering of Chinese mayors and vice-mayors about how they can help their communities reduce greenhouse gas emissions. Anderson was also the only representative from the United States to consult in London with representatives from G8 nations on climate change, in preparation for the 2005 G8 Summit. He also spoke on climate protection issues at the 2006 annual meeting of the Clinton Global Initiative and the 2007 annual meeting of the national Environmental Law Societies.

During Anderson's tenure as mayor, he created the "e2 Business" program, recruiting local businesses to implement major sustainability practices, and led a national campaign against the environmentally and economically destructive use of plastic water bottles, which he has called "the greatest marketing scam of all time". While serving as Executive Director of High Road for Human Rights, Anderson co-authored a major article on the human rights implications of the climate crisis and why climate chaos should be treated as human rights violation.

==== Tobacco ====
Anderson is an ardent opponent of the tobacco industry, and has supported legislative measures to discourage smoking and tax tobacco products.

==== Ethnic minority issues and communities ====
In December 2001, state and federal officials organized a raid at the Salt Lake City Airport to enforce immigration laws against undocumented employees, who were arrested, imprisoned, and fired. In response, Anderson created the Family to Family program, which made it possible for Salt Lake City families to provide direct emotional and financial assistance to the airport workers and their families, while gaining a better understanding of the plight of immigrants. Additionally, the Mayor spearheaded a successful challenge to English-only legislation in Utah in 2000, and later spoke at large demonstrations for comprehensive immigration reform.

Anderson received the League of United Latin American Citizens's first-ever "Profile in Courage" award, as well as the National Association of Hispanic Publications' Presidential Award.

Anderson signed an executive order in 2000 implementing a full-fledged affirmative action program in City hiring. This program led to historic levels of ethnic minority hiring and retention in City government. The percentage of the City government's workforce that was drawn from the ethnic minority community increased more than 30% in seven years, and the number of senior City administrators from the ethnic minority community by 2007 increased by over 85% since 2000. Thirty-two percent of Anderson's appointments to City boards and commissions, and one-third of the staff in the Mayor's Office, were individuals from ethnic minorities.

Along with Jon Huntsman Sr., Anderson co-convened the Alliance for Unity, a non-partisan group of religious and community leaders working to build bridges between diverse people throughout Utah.

==== 2002 Winter Olympics ====
After working with Mitt Romney and leading Salt Lake City through the 2002 Winter Olympics, Anderson handed off the Olympic flag at the closing ceremonies of the 2002 Winter Olympic Games. One of Anderson's key achievements was working effectively with the Utah State Legislature and Mitt Romney in making certain that public safety needs would be adequately financed. Romney later said, "I think a lot of people would look at (the Olympic funding deal) and say it was a minor miracle. [Rocky] was instrumental, key, in reaching a solution."

Anderson endorsed Romney's subsequent 2002 gubernatorial bid in Massachusetts. Romney later endorsed Anderson's 2003 mayoral re-election campaign. Anderson has criticized Romney's changes in position on certain issues after he decided to run for president of the U.S. "The Mitt Romney who ran for and served as governor of Massachusetts was a very different Mitt Romney than has been running for President of the United States ... the real Mitt Romney — the Mitt Romney we all knew and [who] served as governor of Massachusetts — was very reasonable, very moderate — he felt that Roe versus Wade should be the end of the debate on choice; supporter of stem cell research — he was not the right-winger that he seemed to be when he decided he would run for President of the United States."

==== Crime and criminal justice ====
Anderson was a member of the Mayors Against Illegal Guns Coalition, a bi-partisan group with the stated goal of "making the public safer by getting illegal guns off the streets".

Anderson restructured Salt Lake City's criminal justice system and, after reviewing the peer-reviewed literature indicating that DARE is ineffective in reducing drug use, discontinued the DARE program in Salt Lake City schools. Instead, he supported the implementation of other programs — ATLAS and ATHENA — that have demonstrated significant success.

He called for an end to the failed "war on drugs" and for better drug prevention education, the implementation of harm reduction policies, and the availability of substance abuse treatment on demand. He successfully lobbied President Clinton to grant a commutation of a lengthy prison sentence imposed on a Salt Lake City man who had already served several years in a federal penitentiary for his first and only conviction for violating drug laws.

Anderson also worked for years, with several other people, to finally obtain the release from a federal penitentiary of Weldon Angelos, who was sentenced under a federal minimum mandatory statute to 55 years in prison for selling three small amounts of marijuana while he had––but did not use or threaten anyone with––a gun.

In 2000, Anderson ordered the Salt Lake City Police Department to end its participation in the DARE program. He told DARE officials: "I think your organization has been an absolute fraud on the people of this country ... For you to continue taking precious drug-prevention dollars when we have such a serious and, in some instances, growing addiction problem is unconscionable."

In 2006, Anderson appointed Chris Burbank as Salt Lake City Police Chief, emphasizing Burbank's progressive approach to law enforcement and commitment to community policing. Under Burbank's leadership, the department continued to align with Anderson's focus on restorative justice and innovative reforms, including diverting offenders into treatment and counseling programs rather than imposing custodial sentences. Anderson praised Burbank's efforts to foster trust within the community and address systemic issues in policing, which complemented the city's broader criminal justice reforms.

Instead of pushing for more minor offenders to be sent to jail or prison, Anderson constructed innovative restorative justice programs, which earned Salt Lake City a nomination for a second World Leadership Award. He implemented reforms to ensure that mental health courts would channel mentally ill criminals into mandatory treatment programs rather than putting them behind bars. People arrested on drug charges, or for prostitution or the solicitation of prostitutes (as well as several other types of offenses), were sent through a comprehensive course of counselling rather than automatically being handed criminal convictions and custodial sentences. The results were better, and the costs far lower, than with the traditional retributive approach.

==== Economy ====
Anderson promulgated an administrative rule which stipulated that when it considered bids, the city should give preference to companies that paid a living wage to their employees. One Republican legislator called it the "Rocky loophole", and was intent on closing it. The Utah Legislature then passed a statute prohibiting cities from giving such preference.

Establishing a reputation as a fiscal conservative, during the 1999–2007 period Anderson increased the balance of Salt Lake City's general reserve fund by more than 62%, from $20.3 million to $32.6 million.

==== Opposition to the 2003 war in Iraq and human rights abuses ====
Described by Amy Goodman as "one of the most outspoken critics of the Bush administration and the Iraq war," Anderson was a leading opponent of the invasion and occupation of Iraq by the U.S., both before and after the invasion, and was the only mayor of a major city to advocate the impeachment of President Bush and Vice-President Cheney.

He often spoke out against the invasion and occupation of Iraq, and in favor of impeachment, including at several large rallies and state and federal legislative hearings, in Salt Lake City; Olympia, Washington; New York; and Washington, D.C.; and on national television and radio programs hosted by Amy Goodman, Bill O'Reilly, and Tom Ashbrook. He engaged in a live debate with Sean Hannity that focused on Iraq and impeachment.

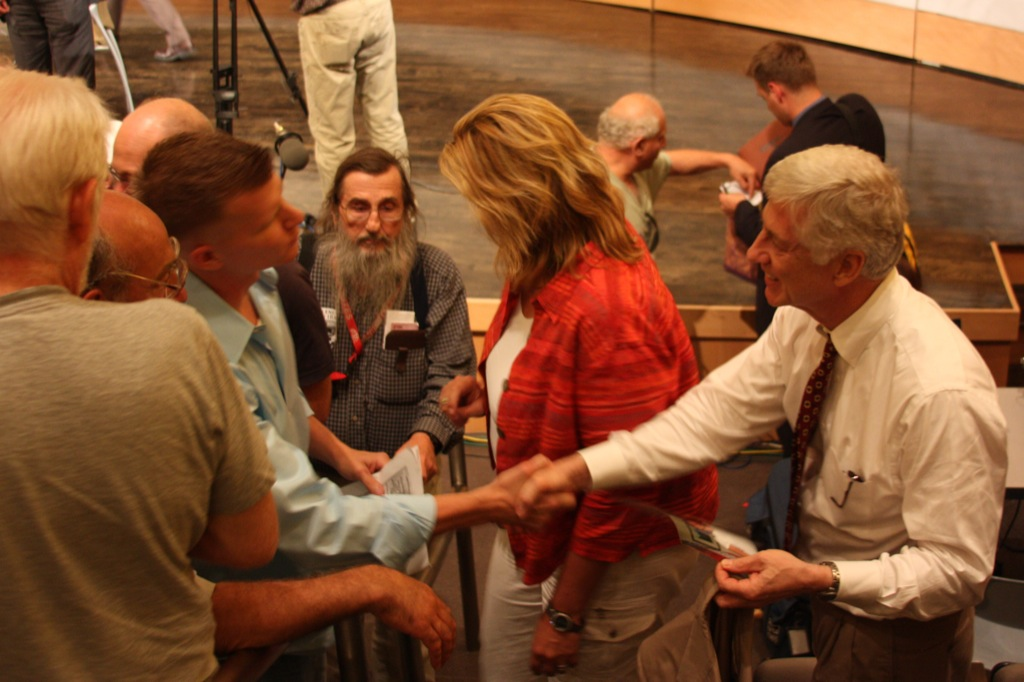
Rocky Anderson meets Andy Figorski, an Iraq war veteran and anti-war activist.

==== Call for the impeachment of President George W. Bush ====
Interviewed by Wolf Blitzer on CNN after an anti-war rally marking the fourth anniversary of the invasion and initial occupation of Iraq, Anderson advocated the impeachment of President George W. Bush, commenting:

This president, by engaging in such incredible abuses of power, breaches of trust with both the Congress and the American people, and misleading us into this tragic and unbelievable war, the violation of treaties, other international law, our constitution, our own domestic laws, and then his role in heinous human rights abuses; I think all of that together calls for impeachment.

Anderson did not spare his criticism of the Democratic Party, saying:

The fact that anybody would say that impeachment is off the table when we have a president who has been so egregious in his violations of our constitution, a president who asserts a unitary executive power, that is absolutely chilling.

In 2006, he expressed his view of the Democratic Party:

But what do I have to say about the Democratic Party? I'm ashamed, really, of how little leadership there has been. There has been just tremendous timidity on the part of the party, generally, although there have been a handful of exceptions. But, you know, we had one member of the United States Senate vote against the PATRIOT Act, the blank check that was given by Congress to this president, I think in total abrogation of the role of Congress under separation of powers and under the power to make war, to declare war. They gave that away to a president that didn't have his facts straight and, I think, was manipulating the intelligence to sell this war.

Anderson researched, wrote, produced, and narrated a major multimedia piece concerning the invasion and occupation of Iraq, as well as the case for impeachment.

=== Human rights advocacy ===
After almost eight years as mayor of Salt Lake City, Anderson decided that he would not run for re-election, and that he would instead devote himself to educating, motivating, and mobilizing people to push elected officials and others to take action to prevent or stop major human rights abuses. Anderson has stressed the importance of people at the grassroots level advocating for progressive change, stating, "We keep expecting elected officials will do the right thing, and the fact is they never do unless they're pushed."

In January 2008 he founded High Road for Human Rights, a non-profit organization set up to achieve major reforms of US human rights policies and practices through unique, coordinated and sustained grassroots activism that complements the work of other human rights organizations.

The principle that underpined the organization is that most politicians will do nothing unless they are pushed. High Road was a bottom-up, grassroots-based organization founded "to make it clear there will be short-term political costs for those who continue to ignore these kinds of problems ... Every time a congressperson or senator comes home and hold a meeting, there [should be] a group there pushing on the same issues", according to Anderson. High Road had a growing membership base and active local teams of people who met and worked together to bring about change.

The organization had a broad-based membership, with an Advisory Committee composed of prominent human-rights, environmental and political activists, as well as artists, actors, and writers, including Ed Asner, Harry Belafonte, Lester Brown, Hillary Brown, Ben Cohen, Daniel Ellsberg, Ross Gelbspan, Susan Joy Hassol, Mark Hertsgaard, Mimi Kennedy, Paul Rogat Loeb, Edward Mazria, Bill McKibben, Yoko Ono, Gus Speth, Winnie Singh, Sheila Watt-Cloutier, Elie Wiesel, and Terry Tempest Williams. High Road for Human Rights primarily addressed five issues: torture and the undermining of the rule of law, genocide, slavery, the death penalty, and the human rights implications of the climate crisis.

Anderson testified before the U.S. House Judiciary Committee during a hearing on September 25, 2008, concerning executive branch abuses of power, and spoke at rallies organized by High Road for Human Rights in which he called for accountability for torture. He has also researched, written, produced, and narrated two multimedia pieces focusing on torture and the undermining of the rule of law.

For his work on human rights matters during his tenure as Executive Director of High Road for Human Rights, Anderson received the Morehouse University Gandhi, King, Ikeda Award and the Bill of Rights Defense Committee's Patriot Award.

=== Criticisms of President Obama and the Democratic Party ===
After President Obama's election, Anderson was critical of many of his policy positions and staff selections. He opposed Susan Rice, whom Obama appointed as United States ambassador to the United Nations. Anderson criticized Rice for "doing nothing" to stop the Rwandan genocide as a staff member of the United States National Security Council. (Samantha Power described how Rice had advocated not using the word "genocide" in connection with the 1994 Rwandan genocide because of the potential "effect on the November [congressional] election."). Anderson was also critical of the appointment by Obama of John Brennan as his counter-terrorism adviser because Brennan, as a member of the George W. Bush administration, had publicly supported wiretapping, "enhanced interrogation", and the "rendition" of war-on-terror suspects to offshore prisons beyond the reach of American law. Anderson also pointed to what he described as Obama's change of position after he received the Democratic presidential nomination on the question of immunity for telecom companies that cooperated with the Bush Administration's wiretapping program.

He was also critical of Obama's advocacy of "clean coal" after winning the Democratic nomination for president. Deeming himself to be "non-partisan" in his critiques of policy, Anderson has subsequently gone on to fiercely criticize the Obama Administration in numerous areas, stating:

I don't know what people were expecting, all this hope and change nonsense ... There's no question that we're seeing a continuation [of the harm to], and even in some instances a worsening of our republic under this administration. The Obama administration has contended that no documents stamped as secret by a government agent should ever be allowed into evidence by our courts. That even goes beyond what the Bush Administration did.

Anderson has emphasized the apparent discrepancies between Obama's positions as a candidate for the 2008 presidency and the actions he has taken as president, believing that "President Obama has betrayed us in almost every single way from being a candidate to being the President of the United States." Anderson has pointed to Obama's failure to close the Guantanamo Bay detention camp, refusing to prosecute what Anderson deems to be the "war criminals" of the Bush administration, continuing renditions, violating the War Power Clause of the Constitution and the War Powers Resolution by committing military troops to Libya without congressional authorization, and continuing, and even expanding, the occupation in Afghanistan. He stated that Obama is "the least deserving recipient of the Nobel Peace Prize in the history of the Nobel Peace Prize."

Concerning Obama's alleged betrayal of the rule of law, Anderson has commented:

The complacency that has allowed wars of aggression, wars of choice, we weren't forced into them, they were totally illegal wars under international law, the kinds of war crimes that took place, with people just saying, even our current president, 'Oh, let's put that behind us. Let's not call people to account. Let's not enforce our laws

On August 11, 2011, major news media in Utah reported that Anderson had denounced the Democratic Party and had resigned his membership. Anderson wrote in a letter to the Democratic Congressional Campaign Committee that "Until the Democratic Party shows some spine and draws a line in the sand — that an end to the tax breaks for the wealthy needs to be part of any debt/budget bill — please take my name off your list." He added: "I'm done with the Democratic Party. As I said on Amy Goodman's show a couple years ago, I've put my 'Proud Democrat' coffee mug in storage. I think now I'll just throw it in the garbage and have done with it" and that "The Constitution has been eviscerated while Democrats have stood by with nary a whimper. It is a gutless, unprincipled party, bought and paid for by the same interests that buy and pay for the Republican Party."

Anderson has stated that despite his earlier belief that the Bush administration would be merely an "aberration" in the history of the US, "President Obama has institutionalized some of the worst abuses of the Bush Administration."

=== Criticisms of President Trump ===
Anderson has been an adamant critic of Donald Trump, having authored written pieces about Trump and his supporters, and produced two videos in advance of the 2020 election accusing him of misogynistic conduct.

=== 2012 presidential campaign ===
On November 29, 2011, the Salt Lake Tribune quotes Anderson as saying, "I'll be announcing my candidacy," for the 2012 presidential nomination of a new national political party. This party later called the Justice Party. Its formation is reported to have been discussed among Anderson; Margaret Flowers, a medical doctor and proponent of a single-payer health plan; Kevin Zeese, an organizer of the Occupy D.C. movement; and former U.S. Rep. John Anderson, who ran for president as an independent in the 1980 presidential election.

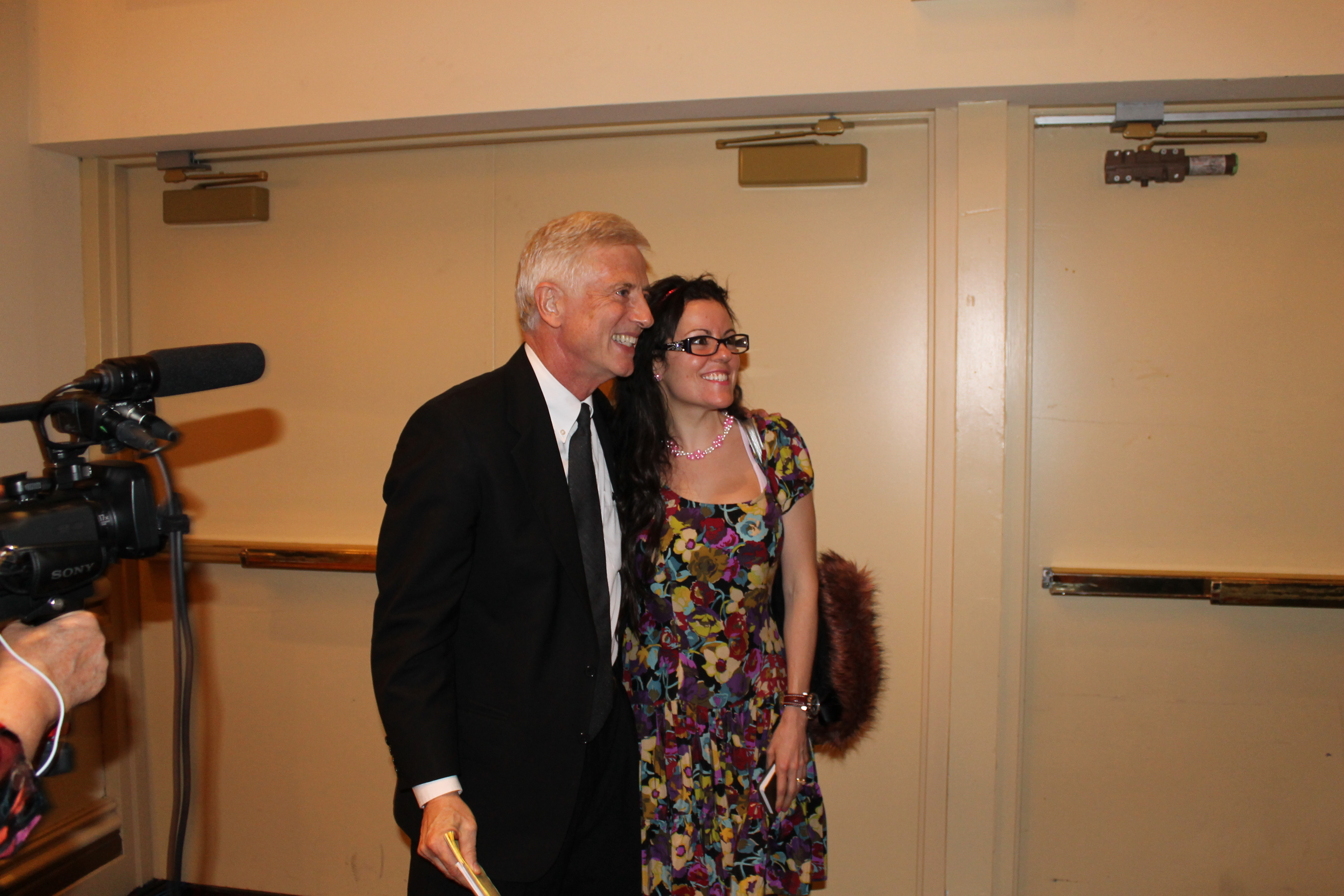
Anderson on the campaign trail in 2012.

Anderson formally accepted the 2012 presidential nomination of the Justice Party on January 13, 2012. His running mate was Luis J. Rodriguez, a Chicano activist and writer from California.

In March 2012, Anderson announced that he was seeking the presidential nomination of Americans Elect in addition to campaigning as the Justice Party nominee. The following May, Americans Elect announced that it would not run a presidential nominee in 2012.

Anderson was nominated by the Natural Law Party in Michigan, the Independent Party of Connecticut, the Independent Party of New Mexico, the Progressive Party of Oregon, and was on the ballot in Idaho and Tennessee as an independent candidate. Anderson appeared on the ballot in new states under the Justice Party banner with running-mate Rodriguez. He also sought the presidential nomination of the Peace and Freedom Party, but withdrew his bid for that nomination in August 2012. In the general election, he received 43,018 votes, or 0.03 percent of the vote.

== Claims and responses ==
In August 2005, Anderson violated Salt Lake City policy when he used $634 in public funds to purchase meals and alcoholic beverages on two occasions for musicians who performed at the Salt Lake City International Jazz Festival and for visiting mayors from throughout the country. The Deseret News published four consecutive front-page articles on the story, and portrayed the purchases as "bar tabs".

When interviewed in September 2005 by the Deseret Morning News, Anderson stated that he disagreed with the policy, asserting that the provision of hospitality to out-of-town visitors is an important mayoral function, and that exceptions to the policy had been made previously. The policy was subsequently changed to allow appropriate purchases of food and alcohol when entertaining out-of-town guests. Mayor Anderson used his private funds to reimburse the City for expenditures incurred while entertaining visiting mayors.

The Deseret News soon generated additional controversy with its coverage of an interview that Anderson gave to The Guardian newspaper in London. Leading with the headline, "LDS Church Not Taliban, Rocky says", the paper noted that Anderson had compared life in Utah to life under the Taliban. Anderson later said the comment, intended to be light-hearted, was not directed toward the state, its residents, or the LDS Church. Rather, he said, the comment was directed toward local media, particularly the Deseret Morning News, which had originally characterized his alcohol and food purchases at a local restaurant as "bar tabs", and which had run articles about the fact that a Salt Lake City Reads Together book selection contained profanity.

In October 2005, local politicians accused Anderson of improperly spending public money. This time the issue centered around travel to Italy connected with the 2006 Winter Olympic Games. Anderson responded that the trip to Turin was to continue the longstanding Olympic tradition of delivering the Olympic message without the use of any fossil fuels and did not cost Utah taxpayers any money since it was privately financed.

On June 12, 2007, following a meeting in a City Council workroom, Anderson was involved in a physical and verbal confrontation with a real-estate developer Dell Loy Hansen. After Hansen reportedly yelled at and grabbed Anderson's shoulder, Anderson responded by threatening to "kick [Hansen's] ass" if he touched Anderson again.

== Personal life ==
Though Anderson has acknowledged the importance of some fundamental moral lessons he learned as a young member of the LDS Church, and has described the value he places on his Mormon heritage, he has spoken out about the LDS Church's discrimination against gays and lesbians, and has written on this issue. He appeared in the films, 8: The Mormon Proposition, and "Quiet Heroes".

Anderson has one son, born in 1982, and has been married and divorced twice. He lives in Salt Lake City with his Golden Retriever, Franklin (full name: Franklin New Deal Wonder Boy) and, decades-old Yellow-Naped Amazon Parrot, Cardozo.

A multi-part documentary by Rhea Gavry and Doug Monroe about Rocky Anderson, including discussions with Daniel Ellsberg, Ralph Nader, Katrina vanden Heuvel and many others, ten years in the making, is now available for viewing.

== Notes ==
Political offices
Preceded by Deedee Corradini	Mayor of Salt Lake City; 2000–2008	Succeeded by Ralph Becker
