= Ralph Becker (Utah politician) =

American politician (born 1952)

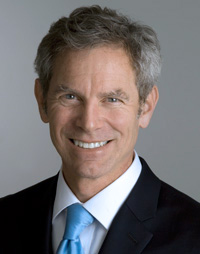

34th Mayor of Salt Lake City
- In office January 7, 2008 – January 4, 2016
- Preceded by: Rocky Anderson
- Succeeded by: Jackie Biskupski

89th President of the National League of Cities
- In office 2015
- Preceded by: Chris Coleman
- Succeeded by: Melode Colbert-Kean

Member of the Utah House of Representatives from the 24th district
- In office 1996–2007
- Preceded by: Frank R. Pignanelli
- Succeeded by: Rebecca Chavez-Houck

Personal details
- Born: May 30, 1952 (age 74) Washington, D.C., U.S.
- Party: Democratic
- Relations: Ralph Elihu Becker (father)
- Education: University of Pennsylvania (BA); University of Utah (JD, MS)

Ralph Elihu Becker Jr. (born May 30, 1952) is an American politician, planner, and attorney who served as the Minority Leader of the Utah State House of Representatives and the 34th mayor of Salt Lake City, Utah.

== Early life and education ==
Becker was born in Washington, D.C. to Ralph Elihu Becker and Ann Watters Becker. His father, Ralph Elihu Becker, was United States Ambassador to Honduras from 1976 to 1977 during the Ford administration.

He graduated from St. Albans School (Washington, D.C.) and attended Lafayette College before he received his B.A. from the University of Pennsylvania in 1973, his J.D. from the University of Utah College of Law in 1977, and his M.S. in Geography/Planning from the University of Utah in 1982.

== Career ==
=== Early career ===
Becker is an attorney and planner who co-founded Bear West in 1985, a planning, natural resources consulting firm, selling the firm in 2007. He also was an adjunct professor at the College of Architecture and Planning, University of Utah from 1978 to 2015.

Becker worked in the National Park Service as a garbage man, firefighter, and ranger (law enforcement and EMT), and Legislative Assistant (1971–76), Utah State Planning Coordinator under Governor Scott Matheson (1981–1985), and Salt Lake City Planning Commissioner (1988–1996). He is a Fellow of the American Institute of Certified Planners.

=== Utah Legislature ===
During his tenure in the Utah State Legislature, Becker served as House Democratic Leader for four years. He also led the passage of the Quality Growth Act (1999) and supported funding for trails, open space, parks, transit, and Utah's first Energy Policy Act. Becker was also an advocate of social justice issues.

=== Mayor of Salt Lake City ===
In November 2006, Becker announced his candidacy for the 2007 race for Salt Lake City Mayor and won on November 6, 2007.

On January 7, 2008, Becker took the oath of office and began his four-year term as mayor. In 2011, Becker was reelected in a landslide, winning 75% of the vote.

In November 2009, Becker signed into law non-discrimination ordinances that forbid landlords and employers to deny housing or jobs due to sexual orientation or gender identity.

In December 2013, Becker officiated over some of the first same-sex marriages performed in the state of Utah.

In February 2014, Becker signed the Freedom to Marry Petition, a non-partisan declaration that "all people should be able to share in the love and commitment of marriage."

Becker served as the 2014–2015 President of the National League of Cities.

== 2007 General Election ==
2007 General Election
Party	Candidate	Votes	%
Democratic	Ralph Becker	27,556	63.77
Republican	Dave Buhler	15,524	35.93
Other	write-ins	129	0.30
Total votes		43,209	100

== 2007 Primary Election ==
Top 2 candidates advance to General Election (Regardless of Party Affiliation)

2007 Primary Election
Party	Candidate	Votes	%
Democratic	Ralph Becker	10,486	38.50
Republican	Dave Buhler	7,570	27.79
Democratic	Jenny Wilson	6,364	23.36
Independent	Keith Christensen	2,295	8.43
(unknown)	J.P. Hughes	378	1.39
(unknown)	John M. Renteria	53	0.19
(unknown)	Quinn Cady McDonough	42	0.15
(unknown)	Rainer Huck	37	0.14
(unknown)	Robert 'Lot' Muscheck	14	0.05
Total votes		27,239	100

== 2011 General Election ==
2011 General Election
Party	Candidate	Votes	%
Democratic	Ralph Becker	12,916	74.91
Republican	J. Allen Kimball	4,150	24.02
Other	Write-Ins	2,121	1.24
Total votes		19,187	100

== Central Wasatch Commission ==
Becker served as the first Executive Director of the Central Wasatch Commission from 2018 to 2022. The Central Wasatch Commission was the outgrowth of Mountain Accord, a consensus-based agreement to better protect the Central Wasatch Mountains and solve issues like mountain transportation.

Political offices
Preceded by Rocky Anderson	Mayor of Salt Lake City; 2008–2016	Succeeded by Jackie Biskupski
