= List of LGBTQ-related organizations and conferences =

Lesbian, gay, bisexual, transgender and queer (LGBTQ) related organizations and conferences range from social and support groups to organizations that are political in nature. Some groups are independent, while others are officially recognized advocacy groups within mainstream religious organizations.

- For groups whose primary purpose is campaigning for the legal rights of LGBTQ people, please see List of LGBTQ rights organizations.
- For organizations affiliated with political parties, please see List of LGBTQ organizations that affiliate with political parties.
- For organizations primarily serving LGBTQ medical professionals or promoting LGBTQ health, please see List of LGBTQ medical organizations.

== International ==
- Affirming Pentecostal Church International – an Apostolic Pentecostal denomination operating in the US and many other countries
- All Out – a global not-for-profit organisation that is focused on political advocacy for the human rights of LGBT people
- Axios – organization of Eastern Orthodox, Byzantine Rite, and Eastern Catholic Christians who are LGBT
- Emergence International – support group for LGBT Christian Scientists (not to be confused with Scientology)
- Encuentro de Lesbianas Feministas de América Latina y del Caribe
- Federation of Gay Games – fosters LGBT self-respect through the Gay Games, an organized international participatory athletic and cultural event
- Frontrunners – LGBT running and walking clubs
- GALA Choruses – Gay and Lesbian Association of Choruses
- Gay Games – an organized international participatory athletic and cultural event held every four years
- Global Alliance of Affirming Apostolic Pentecostals (GAAAP) (Encompasses the former Apostolic Restoration Mission) International LGBT-Affirming Apostolic (Oneness) Pentecostal denomination
- GRIN Campaign – campaigning for social and political equality in education
- Lavender Languages and Linguistics Conference – an international conference for queer linguistics
- International Association of Gay Square Dance Clubs
- International Conference on Bisexuality
- International Mister Leather
- InterPride – an organization of over 200 Pride event organisers
- Metropolitan Community Church
- OutRight Action International – international human rights organization dedicated to improving the lives of people who experience discrimination or abuse on the basis of their sexual orientation, gender identity or expression
- PrimeTimers Worldwide - the world's largest international network of nonprofit Chapters providing social, educational and cultural activities and events for mature adults (21+) who self-identify as gay, bisexual or transgender men.
- Q Christian Fellowship – global membership and attendance, but conference has only been hosted in the United States
- Safe Space Alliance - a non-profit organisation that helps people identify, navigate, and create safe spaces for LGBTQI+ people worldwide.
- Sisters of Perpetual Indulgence

== Africa ==
=== Algeria ===
- Trans Homos DZ

=== Angola ===
- Iris Angola Association

=== Nigeria ===
- Bisi Alimi Foundation

=== Morocco ===
- Kif-Kif

=== Mozambique ===
- Lambda

=== South Africa ===
- Coalition of African Lesbians
- Lesbian and Gay Equality Project
- Gender DynamiX

=== Zimbabwe ===
- GALZ

== Asia ==
=== China ===
- Beijing Queer Chorus

=== Hong Kong ===
- Transgender Resource Center

=== India ===
- Fifty Shades of Gay (FSOG)
- Gay Bombay
- LABIA
- Orinam
- Sahodari Foundation
- Sangama (human rights group)
- Sappho for Equality
- Srishti Madurai

=== Israel ===
- Aswat – a feminist queer group for Palestinian women based in Haifa
- Black Laundry – Israeli LGBT anarchist group which campaigns against the occupation of the Palestinian territories, and other issues
- Israel Gay Youth (IGY)
- The Israeli Gay, Lesbian, Bisexual and Transgender Association – also called "the Aguda", the biggest LGBT rights association in Israel
- Tehila – Support for the parents of LGBT people
- Tel Aviv Municipal LGBT Community Center – Tel Aviv-Yafo's City community center for LGBTQ people.

=== Japan ===
- Arima LGBT Support Group ありまま(LGBTグループ)
- プライドハウス東京 – Pride House Tokyo Japan 2020
- Clinic For Rainbows
- Kanazawa Rainbow Pride 金沢レインボープライド
- Kobe IDAHO 神戸IDAHO
- LGBT Gakushin Circle 学習院大学LGBTサークルにじがく
- LGBT Families and Friends Association LGBTの家族と友人をつなぐ会
- Marriage For All Japan
- Miyoshi Real Estate Group for LGBT 三好不動産フレンズ（LGBT）
- Nijidiversity NPO
- Nijiro Kazoku / Rainbow Families にじいろかぞく
- Osaka Sexual Minorities and Neurodiversity Support Group 発達障害 × セクマイの会 @大阪
- Rainbow Pride Ehime Film Festival
- Sapporo Rainbow Pride (March) さっぽろレインボープライド
- Startline Home Care Agency NPO法人Startline. net / 訪問介護事業所SAISON
- Stonewall Japan Nonprofit
- Takarazuka Human Rights Division ありのままに自分らしく【宝塚市人権男女共同参画課】

=== Mongolia ===
- LGBT Centre Mongolia

=== Nepal ===
- Blue Diamond Society
- Federation of Sexual and Gender Minorities Nepal (FSGMN)
- Mayako Pahichan Nepal
- Mitini Nepal
- Sudur Paschim Samaj (SPS)

=== Taiwan ===
- Taiwan Tongzhi Hotline Association
- Tong-Kwang Light House Presbyterian Church

== Oceania ==
=== Australia ===
- Australian Queer Archives – community-based organization committed to the collection and preservation of material reflecting the lives and experiences of LGBT Australians

=== Coral Sea Islands ===
- Gay and Lesbian Kingdom of the Coral Sea Islands – world's first LGBT micronation

=== New Zealand ===
- Intersex Trust Aotearoa New Zealand – also known as Intersex Awareness New Zealand
- Rainbow Youth

== Europe ==
- BGLBC – BeNeLux LGBTIQ+ Business Chamber]
- East meets West, a network of LGBTIQ professionals from Western & (primarily) Eastern Europe founded in 2013. It acts as the LGBTIQ Business Chamber for CEE Region (Central & Eastern Europe).
- EGLCC – European LGBTIQ Chamber of Commerce, umbrella organization for national European LGBTIQ Chambers of Commerce

=== Denmark ===
LGBT+ Danmark - provides advocacy and counseling for the LGBT community.

=== Bulgaria ===
- Single Step - Provides support to the LGBT community via an online chat helpline, support groups, and psychologist.

=== Germany ===
- Casa Kuà – Trans*Inter*Queer Community Health Center
- DIE LINKE.queer
- GGLBC German LGBTIQ+ Business Chamber – GGLBC German LGBTIQ+ Business Chamber was founded as part of a ceremony in the Cologne Chamber of Commerce and Industry in 2019
- LGBTQ STEM Berlin
- Magnus-Hirschfeld-Centrum – Queer community center in Hamburg, founded in 1983.
- Quaurteera – Russian-speaking queer community in Germany

=== Hungary ===
- Budapest Pride
- Háttér Society
- Hungarian LGBT Alliance
- Labrisz Lesbian Association

=== Ireland ===
- Hirschfeld Centre – an LGBT community centre operating in Dublin, Ireland, from 1979 to 1997
- Irish Gay Dads
- Outhouse – an LGBT community and resource centre operating in Dublin, Ireland, from 1996 to present day
- Lesbians in Cork (LINQ Ireland) – a community and resource centre operating in Cork, Ireland, dedicated to lesbian, bisexual and queer women

=== Italy ===
- Italian GLBT Business Chamber (IGLBC)

=== Scotland ===
- Equality Network – a national organization and charity working for LGBTI rights and equality in Scotland

=== Sweden ===
- Swedish Federation for Lesbian, Gay, Bisexual and Transgender Rights (RFSL)
- Scandinavian LGBT Chamber of Commerce (SGLCC)

=== Switzerland ===
- Dialogai Geneve – Geneva LGBT umbrella organization
- Pink Cross – Swiss LGBT umbrella organization

=== Ukraine ===
- Insight
- KharkivPride
- KyivPride
- National LGBTIQ Conference of Ukraine

=== United Kingdom ===
- Albert Kennedy Trust – organization supporting LGBT homeless
- Albany Trust – educational and counseling organization
- BiCon (UK) – organization for bisexuals that hosts an annual convention.
- Broken Rainbow – charity and support group for victims of same-sex domestic violence
- FLAGS – Active Support Unit for Lesbians and Gays in Scouting – active Support Unit for LGBT people in The Scout Association
- Gay Outdoor Club - UK LGBTQ+ walking and outdoor activities group formed in 1974.
- London Gay Men's Chorus
- London LGBTQ+ Community Centre
- People's Pride Southampton – a charity that aims to bring pride events back to the people with also offering support.
- Pride in STEM – a charitable trust that aims to showcase LGBT people in STEM fields
- Project for Advice, Counselling and Education
- Queercircle – LGBTQ+ arts organisation in London
- Ski Bums
- Stonewall – an LGBT+ rights charity
- Switchboard – helpline providing support for LGBT+ people
- Trans Pride Southampton – a trans+ based group that organises trans pride in Southampton, UK.
- Black Lesbian and Gay Centre (historic) - a community centre operating from South London from 1985 - 2000.
- UK Black Pride - a pride event for the Black LGBTQ+ community, based in London.
- BASH BACK - a "trans-led direct action group".

== North America ==
- Gaylactic Network - a North American LGBTQ science fiction fandom organization
- North American Gay Amateur Athletic Alliance
- Pink Pistols – a gay gun rights organization
- ReconcilingWorks

=== Canada ===
- Chouettes Coquettes – social group for lesbian and bisexual women in Montreal who are their 20s and 30s
- Church of Nomromism – LGBT-affirming religious organization based in British Columbia
- Interligne – a non-profit telephone helpline in Montreal, Canada
- GLBTTQ Community Centre of Ottawa
- Kind Space – a queer community centre located in Ottawa, Ontario
- Pride Library
- 129th Toronto Scouting Group
- The 519 – serving both the Church and Wellesley neighbourhood of Toronto, Ontario, and the broader lesbian, gay, bisexual and transgender (LGBT) communities in the Toronto area
- Lambda Foundation

=== United States ===
- 8th Day Center for Justice
- Adodi – one of the oldest black gay organizations in the US
- American Institute of Bisexuality – organization for bisexuals
- Aromantic-spectrum Union for Recognition, Education, and Advocacy – organization representing aromantic people
- Asexual Visibility and Education Network – organization representing asexual people
- Association of Welcoming and Affirming Baptists – group of individuals, organizations, and congregations which advocate full LGBT-inclusion in Baptist churches
- BAGLY – organization for LGBTQ+ youth in Greater Boston
- Bash Back – network of anarchist and anti-authoritarian queer projects
- Bay Area Bi+ & Pan Network – organization for bisexuals
- Bay View Garden and Yard Society (BVGAYS) – a non-profit gardening and community organization in Milwaukee, Wisconsin
- Bet Mishpachah – Jewish worshiping community in Washington, D.C.
- Bialogue – organization for bisexuals
- BiNet USA – organization for bisexuals
- Bisexual Resource Center – organization for bisexuals
- Center for Sex Positive Culture – aka the Wet Spot
- Commercial Closet Association
- Connecticut Gay Men's Chorus
- DignityUSA – lay organization of LGBT-affirming Roman Catholics, not a church-sanctioned organization
- El/La Para TransLatinas
- GALECA: The Society of LGBTQ Entertainment Critics
- Esperanza Peace and Justice Center
- Gay and Lesbian Labor Activists Network
- Gay, Lesbian, Bisexual, Transgender and Straight Alliance (GLBTSA) at the University of North Carolina at Chapel Hill (UNC-CH)
- Gay Liberation Network
- Gay Men's Chorus of Los Angeles
- Gay Men's Chorus of Washington, D.C.
- Gayglers
- Gender Justice League
- GenPride
- GLAAD
- Global LGBTQIA+ Employee & Allies at Microsoft
- Glisten – an LGBTQ education organization in New York City
- Grace Gospel Chapel – an LGBT friendly Evangelical Christian church in Seattle, Washington
- Greater Seattle Business Association – a.k.a. GSBA, the largest regional LGBT & allied chamber of commerce in the United States and second-largest chamber of commerce in Washington State
- Gulf Coast Archive and Museum of Gay, Lesbian, Bisexual & Transgender History (GCAM) – formed in Houston, Texas, by a group of concerned activists so that our collective histories could be saved – as well as be available for educational uses – through the utilization of a museum or similar venue
- Hudson Pride Connections Center
- IntegrityUSA
- Indy Pride, Inc. – serving the LGBTQ community in and near Indianapolis, Indiana
- Latina lesbian organizations in the United States - List of organizations that were formed out of the intersectionality of lesbian identifying Latina's in the United States
- Lesbian Avengers
- Lesbian Herstory Archives
- Lesbian Sex Mafia
- Lesbians Who Tech + Allies
- LGBT Chamber of Commerce Illinois
- Mazzoni Center
- MASALA (Massachusetts Area South Asian Lambda Association)
- Montrose Center
- More Light Presbyterians
- Mujerío
- Muslim Alliance for Sexual and Gender Diversity
- National Gay Basketball Association
- National Gay Prisoners Coalition
- National LGBT Chamber of Commerce
- National LGBTQ Task Force – supporting action and activism on behalf of LGBTQ people and advances a progressive vision of liberation, including through its Creating Change conference
- National Lesbian and Gay Journalists Association
- New Ways Ministry
- New York Area Bisexual Network – organization for bisexuals
- Oakland Gay Men's Chorus
- OutCare Health
- Out in Science, Technology, Engineering, and Mathematics, Inc. (oSTEM) – a global society dedicated to educating, empowering and fostering leadership for LGBTQA+ communities in the STEM fields.
- Out to Innovate
- Pacific Center for Human Growth
- Point Foundation
- Pride365
- PrideArts
- Pride Foundation
- Principle 6 campaign
- Pro-Life Alliance of Gays and Lesbians
- Queer Cultural Center
- Queer Student Cultural Center
- Reaching Out MBA
- Ruth Ellis Center
- SAGE Services & Advocacy for GLBT Elders
- San Francisco Gay Men's Chorus
- Scouting for All
- Sexuality Information and Education Council of the United States
- Ski Bums
- SPLASH Youth of Northern Colorado – LGBTQIA+ programming for young people, all identities and orientations, ages 5–20
- StartOut
- St. Pat's for All
- Stonewall Columbus (formerly Stonewall Union)
- Stonewall Shooting Sports of Utah
- The Gay and Lesbian Community Center of Southern Nevada – serving the LGBTQ community in and near Las Vegas, Nevada
- Transcending Boundaries Conference – a Northeast American convention for the bisexual community; for genderqueer, transgender, intersex, and polyamorous people, and for their family, friends, and straight allies.

== South America ==
=== Brazil ===
- Casa Chama - A civil society organization that provides assistance to trans people in São Paulo
- Dendê Futebol Clube - A sports club that promotes LGBTQ inclusion in football/soccer

== See also ==
- Intersex civil society organizations
- LGBT-owned business
- List of LGBT organizations that affiliate with political parties
- List of LGBTQ rights organizations
- List of bisexuality-related organizations
