= List of bisexuality-related organizations and conferences =

Bisexual conferences and organizations seek to promote understanding and acceptance, both legally and socially, of bisexual persons.

== International ==
- International Conference on Bisexuality

== United Kingdom ==
- BiCon (UK)
- BiPhoria

== United States ==
- American Institute of Bisexuality
- Bay Area Bisexual Network
- Bialogue
- BiNet USA
- Bisexual Queer Alliance Chicago
- Bisexual Resource Center
- Bisexual Social Network
- National Bisexual Liberation Group
- New York Area Bisexual Network
- Transcending Boundaries Conference, New England

== See also ==
- Bisexual community
- Bisexuality in the United States
- List of LGBT-related organizations
