= Sheela Lambert =

American bisexual activist and writer

- Born: 1956 (age 69–70); New York City
- Died: January, 2024; New York City
- Occupations: Director, Bisexual Book Awards. Founder, Bi Writers Assoc. Writer, editor, bisexual rights activist
- Writing career
- Period: 1990s-2023
- Genres: entertainment journalism, essays, media advocacy
- Subjects: bisexuality, media, popular culture, LGBT
- Website: biwriters.org

Sheela Lambert (1956–2024), a native and lifelong resident of New York City, was an American bisexual activist and writer.

She was the Founder/Director of the Bisexual Book Awards, founder of the Bi Writers Association, was co-founder of Bi Women of All Colors and has been active in a number of bisexual rights groups including BiNet USA. She was openly bisexual and wrote about bisexuality and LGBTQ popular culture/entertainment issues in her national bisexual column for Examiner.com for seven years (2009–2016) as well as articles for The Huffington Post, The Advocate, AfterEllen and AfterElton, Bi Magazine, Lambda Literary Foundation and the America Today LGBTQ Encyclopedia and editing for efforts including Biwriters.org. She presented information on bisexuality issues at universities, conferences, high schools and in-service trainings.

== Education ==
Lambert worked as an HIV Counselor by New York City and New York State.

She has also appeared on a variety of television shows on the topic of bisexuality including Real Personal With Bob Berkowitz (CNBC), The Rolonda Show (syndicated), and The Richard Bey Show (WWOR-TV). Additionally Lambert has been quoted in other media — including The Washington Blade, The New York Blade and Time Out New York — on issues related to bisexuality.

== Lambert's work for bisexual rights ==
=== 1990s ===
Lambert helped produce "Gay Men, Lesbians, Bisexuals, Sharing Our Lives: A Forum on Bisexuality", a forum held in May 1992. The forum was co-sponsored by the Lesbian and Gay Community Services Center (now the Lesbian, Gay, Bisexual and Transgender Community Services Center), New York Area Bisexual Network and BiPAC.

During the 1992–93 television season, Lambert was the on-air correspondent and producer of Out in the 90s, a live New York City Public, educational, and government access (PEG) cable TV channels news and information show for the gay, lesbian, bisexual and transgender community. In 1993, Lambert was the executive producer/host for Bisexual Network, the first television series by and for the bisexual community. The series aired on New York City's public-access television.

In 1996, Lambert joined Heritage of Pride, in which she was an active LGBTQ pride organizer for two years to promote the bi-inclusive agenda as a member. In 2002 Heritage of Pride renamed New York City's Lesbian and Gay Pride events to the Lesbian, Gay, Bisexual and Transgender Pride March, Rally, Festival and Dance.

=== 2000s ===
Together with transgender activist Pauline Park, Lambert formed the Coalition for Unity and Inclusion in 2000. The Coalition was the lead group that successfully lobbied various New York City LGBTQ-related institutions to make their names more inclusive, including New York City's Lesbian, Gay, Bisexual and Transgender Community Center (formerly the NYC Lesbian and Gay Community Services Center) and the New York Lesbian, Gay, Bisexual, & Transgender Film Festival (formerly the New York Lesbian and Gay Film Festival).

In 2000 she co-chaired Community, Unity, Inclusion: The 4th Tri-State Bisexual Conference, held at New York University and co-sponsored by NYU's Office of LGBT Student Services. In 2005, in response to the misinformation put out by the academically disputed Bailey Study, Lambert worked as a senior member of a joint Gay and Lesbian Alliance Against Defamation (GLAAD)/Bialogue task force that began to create information packets to provides facts about bisexuality, dispel myths and stereotypes, and educate the public about issues bisexuals face, as well as provides guidelines for various professionals. In 2006 Lambert founded the national groups the Bi Writers Association, the Bi Mental Health Professionals Association and co-founded the New York City group Bi Women of All Colors. In 2006, she led the successful campaign to convince Lambda Literary Foundation to add a bisexual award category to its literary awards, known as the "Lammys," which did not have a bisexual book category for its first 18 years of operation. She has served as a judge for the Lammy Awards ever since. She also founded the Bi Lines reading series, an annual multi-arts celebration of bisexual writing.

In 2007, Lambert organized two major bi events. Bi Lines: A Celebration of Bisexual Writing in Reading, Music and Culture, held in conjunction with the 19th Annual Lambda Literary Awards events.

She began a bisexuality column on Examiner.com in July 2009 and has posted over 275 articles.

=== 2010s ===
Her first book, Best Bi Short Stories, an anthology of literary fiction short stories, written in multiple genres (of which she is the editor, as well as contributor of the story "Memory Lane") was published in 2014.

== Partial bibliography ==
=== Print ===
Journals

- "Hakomi Therapy Supervision Verbatim." Hakomi Forum (professional journal of The Hakomi Institute), No. 7, Winter 1989.

Magazines

- Reviewed the film Running with Scissors, for GO, October 2006.
- Reviewed independent films The Gymnast, GYPO and Mrs. Stevens Hears the Mermaids Singing and interviewed film directors Linda Thornburg (Mrs. Stevens Hears the Mermaids Singing), Katherine Brooks (Loving Annabelle), Lesli Klainberg (Fabulous!) and the actress and producer Dreya Weber (The Gymnast) for Curve, October, November and December 2006 issues.

=== Online ===
- Bialogue/GLAAD Bisexuality Packet for Mental Health Professionals (2005)
- Interview with Fritz Klein. BiMagazine (2006). Accessed April 7, 2007.
- AfterEllen.com, May 31, 2006. Accessed April 6, 2007.
- AfterEllen.com, June 19, 2006. Accessed April 8, 2007.
- AfterEllen.com, October 15, 2006. Accessed April 7, 2007.
- Profile of Michael Musto. AfterElton.com, January 8, 2007. Accessed April 6, 2007.

== See also ==
- Biphobia
