= Diane Middlebrook =

American poet (1939-2007)

- Born: Diane Helen Wood; April 16, 1939; Pocatello, Idaho, U.S.
- Died: December 15, 2007 (age 68); San Francisco, California, U.S.
- Occupations: University professor; author; poet
- Writing career
- Genre: Biography
- Notable works: Anne Sexton, A Biography (1991); Suits Me: The Double Life of Billy Tipton (1998); Her Husband: Ted Hughes & Sylvia Plath, a Marriage (2003)

Diane Helen Middlebrook (née Wood; April 16, 1939 – December 15, 2007) was an American biographer, poet, and teacher. She taught feminist studies for many years at Stanford University. She wrote critically acclaimed biographies of poets Anne Sexton and Sylvia Plath (along with Plath's husband Ted Hughes), and jazz musician Billy Tipton.

== Early life ==
Middlebrook was born Diane Helen Wood in Pocatello, Idaho, the oldest of three daughters. Her parents were teenagers when she was born. In 1945, when Diane was five, the family moved to Spokane, Washington. She graduated from North Central High School in 1957.

== Education and teaching career ==
Middlebrook expressed her desire to become a published poet and writer, but received no encouragement from her family. She paid her own way through college. She entered Whitman College in Walla Walla, Washington, then transferred to the University of Washington in Seattle. She received a Bachelor of Arts degree in 1961. She entered Stanford University as an assistant professor of English in 1966, then obtained a Ph.D. from Yale University in 1969. Her doctoral dissertation was a combined study of American poet Wallace Stevens and American poet/philosopher/essayist Walt Whitman; her doctoral advisor was the American writer and literary critic Harold Bloom.

Middlebrook began her teaching career at Stanford as an assistant professor in 1966 and gradually worked her way up to university professor and associate dean positions. She won a number of fellowships, grants, and awards along the way. She had not focused on feminist studies before she was tapped for Stanford's new Center for Research on Women (eventually to become the Clayman Institute for Gender Research), one of the first such centers in the nation in the 1970s. She once stated that her chief qualifications were her sex and her availability. She directed the Center from 1977 to 1979. She was chair of Stanford's Feminist Studies Program from 1985 to 1988. She embraced diverse curricula: one syllabus from that era lists both Ovid and Queen Latifah.

Middlebrook received fellowships from the National Endowment for the Humanities, Bunting Institute at Radcliffe College, the Stanford Humanities Center, the John Simon Guggenheim Foundation, and the Rockefeller Study Center of Bellagio. She was a founding trustee of the Djerassi Resident Artists Program, an interdisciplinary arts center in the Santa Cruz Mountains.

Middlebrook received two honors from Stanford for her teaching effort. In 1977 she was given The Dean's Award; in 1987 she was given the Walter J. Gores Award. She also received the Richard W. Lyman service award.

She resigned from Stanford in 2002 to concentrate fully on her writing. By this time, she was a professor emerita.

== Writing career ==
Middlebrook once stated why she preferred preparing biographic work to other fields of study: "One of the reasons I like working on biographies is that it takes a long time, you don't have to work quickly. People are going to stay dead." When asked why she had picked Ovid as a subject for a biography, she said: "No estates, no psychotherapy, no interviews, no history—I just make it up."

In 1981 Middlebrook was asked by the Sexton estate to write a biography of the poet Anne Sexton, and she began working on the book in 1982. The resulting book, Anne Sexton: A Biography, spent eight weeks on The New York Times Best Seller list. Joyce Carol Oates called the book "sympathetic but resolutely unsentimental ... intelligent, sensitive, at times harrowing." The book was controversial, as Middlebrook was given access to and used some 300 hours of Sexton's sessions with psychiatrists.

Middlebrook's book about Sexton's friend and fellow-suicide, Sylvia Plath, was published as Her Husband: Ted Hughes & Sylvia Plath, a Marriage in 2003. Publishers Weekly called it the "gold standard" of the many books published about the couple, and it became a Los Angeles Times bestseller. Writing for The New York Times, Daphne Merkin called the book an "attentive and cleareyed account," but noted that "even Middlebrook's inspiring slant can't obscure the chill at the heart of this story."

She published many articles on Sexton, Plath, Hughes, and other writers, such as Robert Lowell and Philip Larkin. She also reviewed a wide variety of books on subjects ranging from Helen Keller to the development of modern clothing.

At the time of her death, Middlebrook was preparing a biography of the Roman poet Ovid, to be published in 2008. The completed parts of the biography were eventually published as Young Ovid: A Life Recreated in 2015.

Middlebrook was noted for her openness and honest, sometimes "brutal" biographical writing.

== Books ==
Middlebrook's publications include:

=== Biographies ===
- Walt Whitman and Wallace Stevens (1974)
- Anne Sexton, A Biography (1991), Houghton Mifflin Company
- Suits Me: The Double Life of Billy Tipton (1998)
- Her Husband: Ted Hughes & Sylvia Plath, a Marriage (2003), Viking Adult

=== Poetry ===
- Worlds Into Words: Understanding Modern Poems (1980)
- Coming to Light: American Women Poets in the 20th Century (1985)
- Selected Poems of Anne Sexton (1988)
- Gin Considered as a Demon (1983)
- Women Writing Poetry in America: Poetry Broadsides by California Women Printers (editor) (1982)

== Awards ==
Anne Sexton: A Biography, was a finalist for the National Book Award and for the National Book Critics Circle Award. It was awarded a gold medal in nonfiction from the Commonwealth Club of California.

Suits Me won a Lambda Foundation Literary Award. The Financial Times wrote: "Tipton may have spent his life fearing exposure, but he/she [sic] could not have wished for a more perceptive or sympathetic biographer than Middlebrook."

Her Husband was a 2004 finalist for the Bay Area Book Reviewers Award in non-fiction. In 2006, the French translation won the Prix Du Meilleur Livre Étranger.

== Personal life and death ==
Middlebrook was married three times. Her first two marriages, to Michael Shough and Jonathan Middlebrook, were annulled, though she kept the surname "Middlebrook" professionally. She had one daughter, Leah Middlebrook, born 1966, who also became a university professor and taught Comparative Literature and Romance Languages at the University of Oregon. In 1977, she began a relationship with pharmaceutical chemist Carl Djerassi, and the two married in 1985.

Middlebrook retired in 2002 and persuaded Djerassi to retire from chemistry that year, although he continued to write fiction and drama. She concentrated more fully on her research, and she and Djerassi divided their time between their residences in San Francisco and London. She underwent surgery for cancer in July 2001 and again in February 2004. Her death in San Francisco, California, on December 15, 2007, at the age of 68 was attributed to retroperitoneal liposarcoma. Djerassi stated that she continued working until the month before her death.
