= Point Foundation (scholarship fund) =

American LGBTQ+ scholarship fund

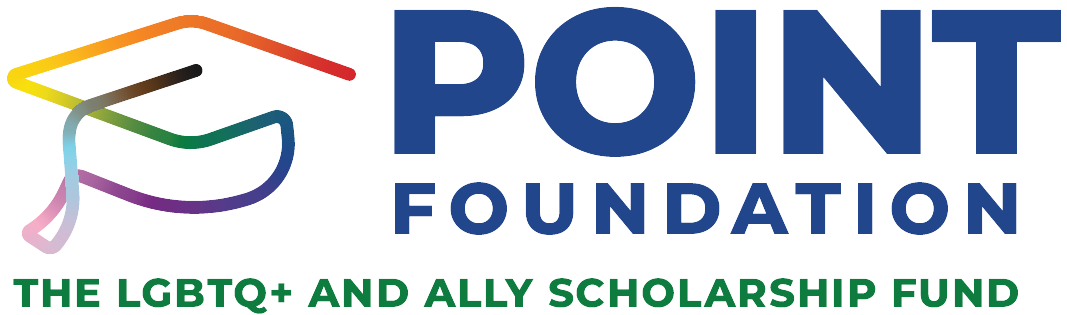
- Formation: 2001
- Legal status: 501(c)(3) nonprofit organization
- Headquarters: Los Angeles, California
- Chief Executive Officer: Jorge Valencia
- Website: https://www.pointfoundation.org/

Point Foundation is a scholarship fund that provides financial aid for lesbian, gay, bisexual, transgender, queer, and ally college bound students in the United States. Founded in 2001, the overall mission of this organization to give these individuals the opportunity to receive the resources that they need to become pillars in society.

== History ==
Point Foundation was founded in 2001 and awarded its first scholarships in 2002. The goal of founding the Point Foundation was to create a scholarship fund that supports LGBTQ+ and ally students who may be facing discrimination. The organization awarded 8 scholarships to students in its first year and 27 scholarships in its second year.

In 2004, Point Foundation moved its headquarters to Chicago. The organization's scholarships and student services budget of $500,000 had by 2006 increased to more than $3 million, in part due to sponsorships from TimeWarner, CitiGroup, and Abercrombie & Fitch, among other companies. Point Foundation moved its headquarters from Chicago to Los Angeles in 2007 with the appointment of Jorge Valencia to lead the organization.

In 2021, Point Foundation partnered with the Williams Institute to conduct a national survey among LGBTQ+ students on federal student loan debt and access to student housing.

As of 2023, Point Foundation was the largest scholarship program for LGBTQ+ and ally college students in the US. In 2025, the organization supported 755 LGBTQ+ and ally students across its scholarship programs.

=== Point Honors gala ===
Point Foundation has hosted annual Point Honors benefit galas to raise funds for the organization and to recognize leaders who serve as role models to LGBTQ+ and ally students. The organization has recognized a number of celebrities for their leadership at Point Honors gala events with its Point Impact and Point Courage awards.

== Scholarship programs ==
As of 2025, Point Foundation offered three types of scholarships for LGBTQ+ and ally students in the US: Flagship Scholarships, Community College Scholarships, and Access Scholarships. In addition to providing students with financial support, the organization offers mentorship, internships, and professional development opportunities to scholarship recipients.

Since its founding, Point Foundation has offered its Flagship Scholarship for LGBTQ+ and ally students pursuing undergraduate, graduate, and doctoral degrees in the United States. With financial support from Wells Fargo, Point Foundation expanded its scholarship programs to include a Community College Scholarship Program. The organization awarded the Community College Scholarship to 25 students in 2017 and to 80 new students in 2022. The Access Scholarship is specific to LGBTQ+ and ally students who will be the first in their families to earn a college degree and/or who come from a low-income background.

== See also ==
- List of LGBTQ-related organizations and conferences
- Campus Pride
- Pride Foundation
- Education and the LGBTQ community
