= Stonewall Jackson Youth Development Center =

Historic school building in North Carolina, United States

- Stonewall Jackson Youth Development Center; Stonewall Jackson Training School Historic District
- U.S. National Register of Historic Places
- U.S. Historic district
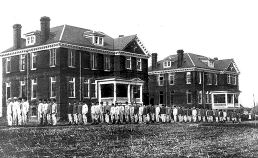

- Location within North Carolina Location within the United States
- Location: SR 1157, Concord, North Carolina
- Coordinates: 35°21′51″N 80°35′54″W
- Area: 800 acres (320 ha) (58 acres (23 ha) still used)
- Built: 1909
- Architect: Louis H. Asbury
- Architectural style: Colonial Revival
- NRHP reference No.: 84001966
- Added to NRHP: March 15, 1984

Cabarrus Youth Development Center (Formerly Stonewall Jackson Youth Development Center) is a juvenile correctional facility of the North Carolina Department of Public Safety located in unincorporated Cabarrus County, North Carolina, near Concord.

The historic Stonewall Jackson Manual Training and Industrial School was established by an act of the state legislature in 1907 and opened in 1909 as the first juvenile detention facility in North Carolina. The school was named for Confederate General Stonewall Jackson. The institution is located three miles (5 km) from Concord. Walter Thompson was the first principal. Originally encompassing 290 acres (1.2 km^{2}), the campus is 800 acres (3,200,000 m^{2}), 58 acres (230,000 m^{2}) of which are still used, with 5 buildings on the property. As of 2018–19, the Youth Development Center had 107 residents and the Juvenile Detention Center had 26, with full-time equivalent staff of 257.

Due to the school's pioneering status and the quality of several of its early buildings, the Stonewall Jackson Training School Historic District has been listed on the National Register of Historic Places. This designation includes 71 acres and 50 buildings.

It was previously operated by the North Carolina Department of Juvenile Justice and Delinquency Prevention.

== History ==
Established to provide a place for troubled youths separate from adult prisoners, this was considered a progressive institution. Its founding was the result of twenty years of organizing by white women's groups in North Carolina. They lobbied for construction of a reformatory for white boys as part of prison reform.

Particularly influential were the King's Daughters (North Carolina) from 1902 on, and the Women's Christian Temperance Union (WCTU). The North Carolina Federation of Women's Clubs (NCFWC) and the United Daughters of the Confederacy (UDC) also participated in campaigning strongly to raise funds and influence the legislature. When the King's Daughters promised to name the school after General Stonewall Jackson, many Confederate veterans in the legislature finally approved the project, which was authorized in 1907. As a sign of their influence, four women were named to the board of the school.

Boys were generally incarcerated for relatively minor scrapes with the law, including school truancy.

At the school, the young men lived in a series of dormitory style buildings, and received an academic education as well as learning a trade. Students worked in industries including shoemaking, printing, barbering, textiles, and a machine shop. Many of the young men worked on the school's farm, learning modern agricultural techniques, and maintaining the fields and cattle herds that supported the school. The print shop produced a small newspaper called The Uplift.

Both white and African-American women's groups pressed the legislature for similar facilities for white girls, and for African American boys and girls. Such facilities were not constructed for several years: the first, for white girls, was built in 1918 in Moore County and called Samarcand.

== Post-World War II ==
In 1948 as part of continuing statewide efforts to limit "feeblemindedness" and improve the population, the Stonewall Jackson Training School was the site of sterilization by vasectomy of six teenage white males, in operations authorized by the state Eugenics Board. Most sterilizations were performed on girls and women rather than boys or men. North Carolina was one of the last states that continued to perform sterilizations on people under state care.

During the decades of its existence, the School was criticized for abuses common in many detention facilities, such as overcrowding and prisoner violence. At its peak the facility held about 500 youths. At times there were inhumane conditions in which youths were attacked and raped by other inmates. Prison activist Russell Dan Smith stated he suffered such attacks there when imprisoned in the 1960s from age 13–15. As an adult (and after time in state and federal prisons), Smith became an activist against prison violence, founding both the National Gay Prisoners Coalition (NGPC) and, in 1980, People Organized to Stop Rape of Imprisoned Persons (POSRIP).

In the 1970s, ideas about treating youths changed, and they were seldom incarcerated for offenses as minor as delinquency. The state reduced the population at the facility. The size of the campus had been reduced earlier when the extensive agricultural program was dropped. Later called the Stonewall Jackson Youth Development Facility, it was used for serious offenders involved in drug abuse and weapons-related charges. About 150 young men were generally held there. Sixty acres of the facility were enclosed by a 15-foot (4.6 m)-high fence.

Starting in 1992 the center had a Pet Therapy Program, in which youth learned to care for dogs. Animals were sometimes made available for adoption outside the center.

Architectural historian Peter Kaplan, speaking to a 2014 meeting of the Historic Cabarrus Association, called the historic campus "which I understand is now completely vacant ... a remarkable collection of Colonial Revival buildings and one of Cabarrus County’s most impressive architectural groupings."

As of 2015 23 of the 60 structures were used, and most of them were used for storage purposes.

As of 2019, the Stonewall Jackson Youth Development Center served "at-risk youth", allowing them to attend high school or receive a GED. In 2020, the center was renamed Cabarrus Youth Development Center.

In 2020, North Carolina State Senator Paul Newton sponsored a bill transferring the historic campus to Cabarrus County along with 238-acre (960,000 m^{2}) Frank Liske Park, which was a farm used by the school and became a park in 1979, leased to the county since then. Demolition of the historic buildings would cost $3.8 million but selling the buildings increases the chance for preservation. This bill has become law.
