= GLBTTQ Community Centre of Ottawa =

Canadian nonprofit organization

Gay, Lesbian, Bisexual, Trans, Two-Spirit, and Queer Community Centre of Ottawa
- Abbreviation: GLBTTQ Community Centre of Ottawa
- Formation: 2006
- Type: Organizations based in Ottawa, Ontario, Canada
- Legal status: active
- Purpose: advocate and public voice, educator and network
- Headquarters: Ottawa, Ontario, Canada
- Region served: Ottawa, Ontario, Canada
- Official language: English, French

The Gay, Lesbian, Bisexual, Trans, Two-Spirit, and Queer Community Centre of Ottawa was an incorporated non-profit organization which worked towards providing a community centre for the LGBTQ community in Ottawa, the capital of Canada.

== History ==
GLBTQ groups in Ottawa have had a variety of initiatives to try to create a visible focal point for their community in recent decades. Each of these projects has appeared to build upon the efforts of the previous project.

=== ALGO Years ===
One of the earliest groups to have attempted to create an LGBT community centre was the Association of Lesbians and Gays of Ottawa. The project came at a time when homosexuality was still treated as criminal, a disease, and/or a deviancy. ALGO was successful in organising a variety of social events for the LGBT community in the city.

=== Pink Triangle Services' Initiative ===
In later years as ALGO eventually declined in Ottawa's community the project to create a community centre was picked up by Pink Triangle Services (or PTS). As PTS grew and so did the number of services it provided to the city's GLBT citizens it became necessary to expand their facilities. To date, PTS continues to lease space for their facilities. Part of the intention behind the LGBT community centre of Ottawa initiative was to create a space that could house PTS and other LGBT organisations at a reasonable cost.

For a time the initiative managed to lease a space near the intersection of Bank and Nepean Streets. This community centre served to provide an alternative space for a variety of PTS projects as well as a location to host the events and projects of other organizations in Ottawa's LGBT community.

In 2004 Bob Chiarelli, the mayor of Ottawa, pledged his support for a community centre, although no actual details were given at the time. In 2005 an emergency summit was held to discuss the future of the community centre initiative. As members of the ad hoc committee felt that the task was too daunting to continue and it was replaced with new membership in a steering committee.

The new steering committee members went to task and, with both direct and indirect help from PTS, To Be, Capital Xtra! and the city of Ottawa, was able to begin the process of incorporating into its own organisation. In 2006 the city of Ottawa provided a $5000 CDN Trust held by Pink Triangle Services to begin the process of incorporation which would finally result in the receipt of Letters Patent in April of the same year.

=== GLBTTQ Community Centre of Ottawa, Inc. ===
Upon receiving its letters patent, the community centre initiative became "The Gay, Lesbian, Bisexual, Trans, Two-Spirit, and Queer Community Centre of Ottawa, Inc."

As of May 2006, the new corporation is on its way to applying for charitable status under Canadian law. On September 17, 2006, the Community Centre's inaugural Annual General Meeting was held. Guests included City of Ottawa Mayor Bob Chiarelli, and a group of Two-Spirit Drummers from Minwaashin Lodge. Five new Trustees were elected and the Nominations Committee was charged with seeking new candidates to fill the remaining vacancies. The proposed corporate by-laws were also passed and the members received the Chair's report and a financial statement from the Treasurer.

The 2006–07 board began the process of strengthening ties within Ottawa's LGBTQ community as well as consulting with various parts of it in order to further develop its strategic planning.

In late 2008, a GLBTTQ Community Centre of Ottawa Facebook group was created and a core group of volunteers began preparations for a special General Meeting to elect a new board of trustees and reinvigorate the project. That Special General Meeting took place on February 19, 2009, elected a seven-member board of trustees.

== Controversies ==
Though the process of creating the community centre has been relatively smooth there have been some minor controversies.

=== Name ===
One of the first controversies was over the name of the new corporation. the previous community centre had been named using the term GLBT but with a mind towards inclusivity some members of the community wished the corporation to include more Ts and Qs to represent Two-Spirit, both Transgender, and Transsexual, as well as Queer and Questioning peoples. Other members wished to have an unrelated name such as was the case with The 519 Church St. Community Centre, which would put no particular emphasis on any group.

Ultimately the above name was chosen and it was decided that the general community would later be invited to make suggestions for a working name and logo for the community centre. The acronym used by this organisation is unique not just in Canada but worldwide. The community centre has also recognised the variety of identities used by members of the LGBTQ community and seeks to welcome all those groups and their allies.

=== Location ===
Many members of the community feel that the area around the intersection of Bank and Somerset Streets is the core of the gay community while others feel that other neighbourhoods also have large concentrations of LGBTQ peoples.

While no decision has been made it has been noted by the steering committee that issues of accessibility and infrastructure will be critical to the centre's future location(s). As a result, the steering committee initiated plans to survey the LGBT community through the media, and its website.

=== Funding ===
In 2006 the community centre initiative received approx. $5000 Canadian to support the process of incorporation. With the upcoming mayoral elections in Ottawa this caused some backlash in the general community. However, this controversy seemed to have died down around the same time as Alex Munter announced his candidacy for mayor, as well as next to the more prominent local issues.

=== Near dissolution ===
At the 2007 annual general meeting, a motion to dissolve the corporation could not be voted on because quorum was not met.

== See also ==
- List of LGBT community centers
- Gay Village
