= Pride at Work =

LGBTQ constituency group of the AFL-CIO

P@W
- Pride At Work
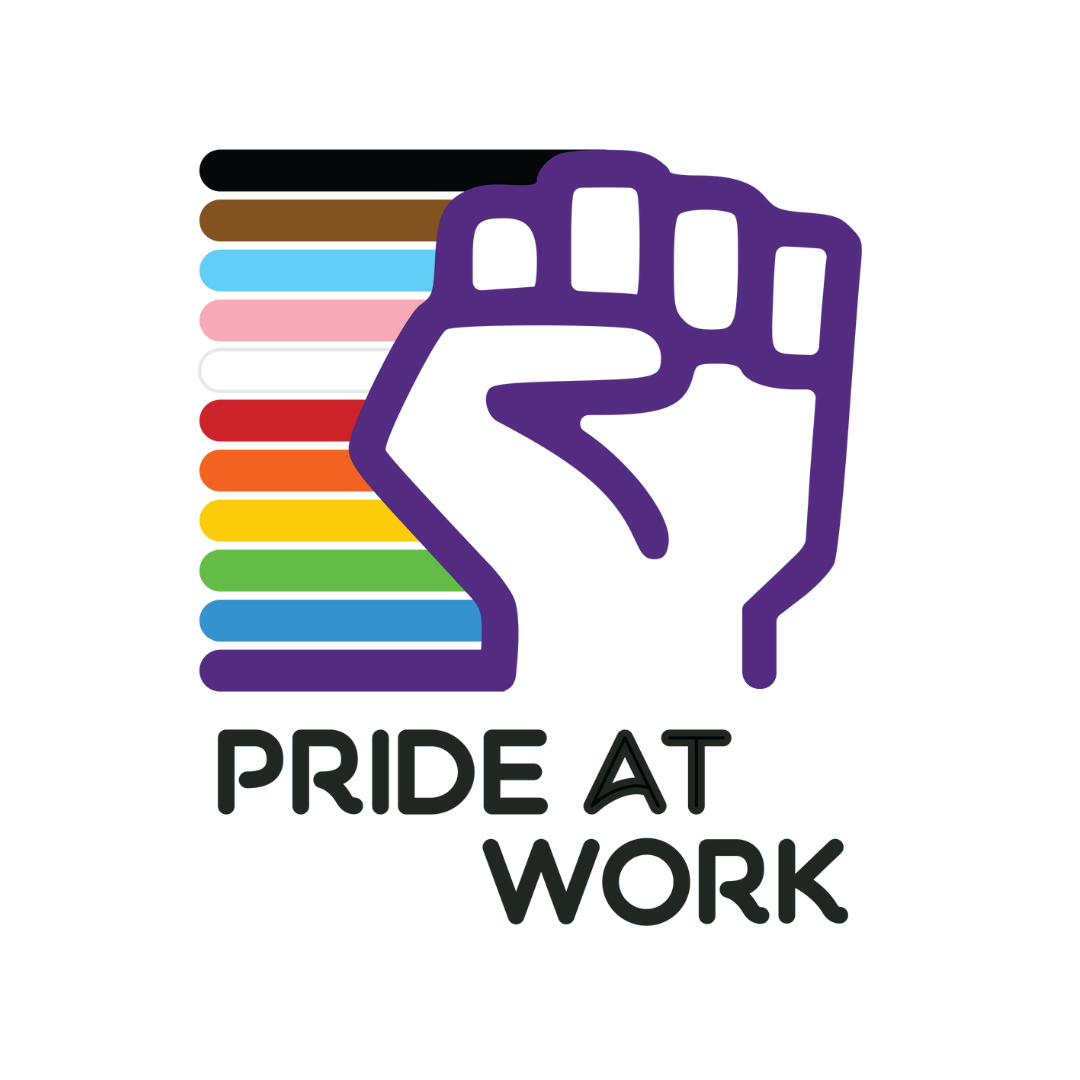
- Founded: 1994
- Headquarters: Washington, D.C.
- Location: United States
- Key people: Jarel Sanders (AFSCME) and Brittani Murray (USW), Co-Presidents
- Affiliations: AFL-CIO
- Website: www.prideatwork.org

Pride At Work (P@W) is an American lesbian, gay, bisexual and transgender group (LGBTQ+) of labor union activists affiliated with the AFL-CIO.

== Gay rights and the labor movement ==
The openness, visibility and participation of LGBTQIA+ people in the American labor movement is closely linked to that of the American Gay Rights Movement. But gay activism flourished in a limited way in some sectors of the "house of labor." The National Union of Marine Cooks and Stewards (NUMCS), which represented workers on luxury liners, included among its leaders the openly gay Stephen R. Blair. NUMCS was derided as "red, black and queer" for its leftist politics, racial integration and the large number of gay members. A sign in the union hall proclaimed, "Race-baiting, Red-baiting, and Queer-Baiting is Anti-Union." Blair's life-partner, Frank McCormick, was a vice president of the California Congress of Industrial Organizations and an important leader in the 1934 West Coast longshore strike. Harry Hay was an organizer for the Retail, Wholesale and Department Store Union in New York City. Attending the Southern California Labor School, he met many of the men who would later become some of the first members of the Mattachine Society, whose initial five members were all union activists.

Bayard Rustin, an openly gay man and a principal organizer of the 1963 March on Washington for Jobs and Freedom, later became the first executive secretary of the A. Philip Randolph Institute. Another openly gay man, Tom Kahn wrote speeches for and served as assistant to AFL-CIO presidents George Meany and Lane Kirkland, as well as head of the AFL-CIO's International Affairs Department from 1986 until his death in 1992. Openly gay Bill Olwell became an international vice president of the Retail Clerks International Union (RCIU) in 1972, and was later elected to a similar position with the United Food and Commercial Workers (UFCW) in 1986 after the RCIU merged with the Amalgamated Meat Cutters to form the UFCW.

The first public endorsement of LGBTQIA+ rights by an American labor union, however, did not occur until 1970, after the Stonewall Rebellion. In that year, the executive council of the American Federation of Teachers passed a resolution which denounced discrimination against teachers solely because the individual was a homosexual. A second step forward for LGBT labor activists came with the Coors strike and boycott. As part of its anti-union efforts, the company administered lie-detector tests to prospective employees asking about their union views. Among the questions also asked was whether the job applicant was a homosexual. In 1974, the Teamsters were attempting to organize workers at Coors. Two straight Teamster organizers approached San Francisco gay community leaders Howard Wallace, a teamster union activist, and Harvey Milk, then an emerging political activist, about supporting the boycott. Wallace and Milk agreed, if the Teamsters would agree to promote the hiring of openly gay truck drivers. The Teamsters consented. The Coors boycott took off in San Francisco, and spread nationally. In California, the market share of Coors dropped from 40 percent to 14 percent. Facing this boycott, Coors stopped asking its applicants about their sexuality.

The gay rights and labor movements joined forced again in 1978. Proposition Six, known as the Briggs amendment, would have banned gays from teaching in California public schools. A coalition of gay and union activists was formed and defeated the amendment.

In 1979, the quadrennial convention of the AFL-CIO unanimously adopted a resolution calling for the enactment of federal legislation banning discrimination based on sexual orientation.

Throughout the 1970s and 1980s, a number of LGBTQIA+ union members had formed caucuses within their respective unions. Organizations with large numbers of members which became politically active, even electorally important, included those within the Service Employees International Union, American Federation of State, County and Municipal Employees, the Communications Workers of America and UFCW.

== Origins ==
In June 1994, LGBT union activists gathered in New York City as part of the 25th anniversary of the Stonewall riots. Wallace and others associated with the Gay and Lesbian Labor Activists Network (GALLAN), an organization of LGBT labor union activists in San Francisco, pushed for the formation of national organization out of frustration with the labor movement's silence during the debate over the Defense of Marriage Act. Taking a cue from a 1990 booklet titled Pride at Work: Organizing for Lesbian and Gay Rights in Unions, the group decided to adopt the title as its name.

In 1997, PAW affiliated as a constituency group of the AFL-CIO. Affiliation did not come easily. Several members of the AFL-CIO's executive council argued that the group was too small to affiliate. Affiliation was also opposed on the basis that members of the group were not historically discriminated against in collective bargaining, and that the members should work through their local and international unions. This claim led to accusations by some members of the executive council and the LGBT union community that those opposing affiliation were homophobic. But AFL-CIO president John Sweeney pushed hard for the affiliation. When a final vote was taken, opponents of affiliation abstained rather than vote no.

PAW's relationship to the AFL-CIO proved rocky at first. Unlike other AFL-CIO constituent organizations, Pride at Work was not given a budget to help fund its operations until 1999. In 2006, funding was still minimal. From the outset, however, PAW was given full access to AFL-CIO state and local labor councils and international member unions, enhancing its research and mobilization efforts substantially.

== Structure ==
Pride at Work is a non-profit organization. It has five executive officers: two Co-Presidents, one Vice President, one Treasurer, and a Recording-Secretary. The Co-Presidents chair the National Executive Board and the Executive Committee of the organization. Each officer has a four year term, with elections held at the organization's quadrennial membership convention.

PAW's governing body is the National Executive Board (NEB). The NEB is composed of the five executive officers; chapter representatives elected from the chapters; a member appointed by the President of the AFL-CIO; members appointed by International Union Presidents; and three Diversity Representatives elected at the membership convention. P@W's National Executive Board meets at least once a year.

Chapter representation on the NEB is proportionate to membership. A chapter which represents 5 percent or more of the organization's membership is entitled to one representative on the NEB. Each June 30 in a non-convention year, smaller chapters may seek recognition from the organization to determine whether they meet the 5 percent cut-off mark. Following each quadrennial membership convention, small chapters not meeting the 5 percent threshold collectively elect one Small Chapters Representative.

Diversity Representatives are important to PAW's work as an organization. Categories covered under diversity include but are not limited to race, industrial sector, rank and file status, gender identity, union representation, gender, age and geographic area (especially those targeted for new chapter organizing).

An Executive Committee governs the organization between meetings of the National Executive Board.

Per the bylaws, an Executive Director is appointed by the Executive Committee and directed by the Co-Presidents. there must be at least one executive director.

Per the national bylaws, the membership conventions are the highest decision-making body in the organization. Members may be at-large or members of local chapters. As of 2023, PAW has 31 established chapters. PAW holds a quadrennial convention, usually in August or September. The most recent convention was held in Minneapolis in 2022.

== Goals and program ==
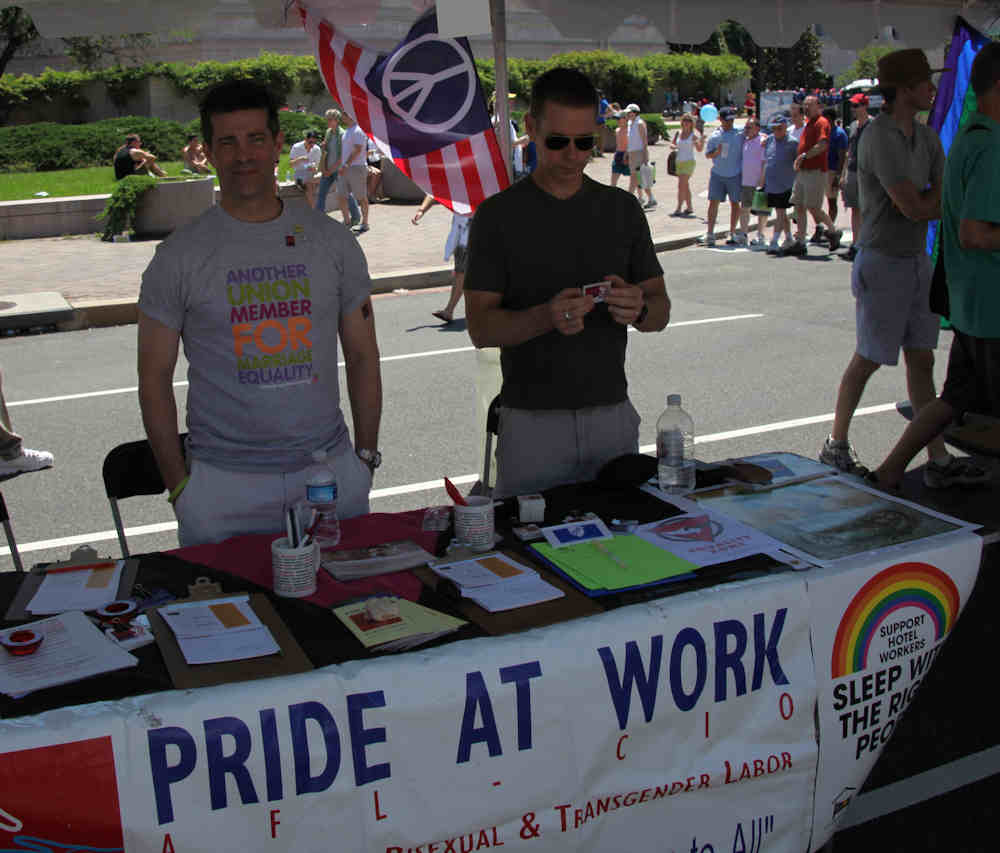
Pride at Work members distribute literature and educate the public about union organizing campaigns affecting LGBTQ workers at the Capital Pride street festival in Washington, D.C., on June 14, 2009.

Pride at Work exists to build tolerance and support for LGBTQIA+ members in the workplace and in labor unions.

The organization educates LGBTQIA+ people about their rights as workers, the organized labor movement and the principles of trade union solidarity; encourages and assists LGBTQIA+ workers to organize and to become active participants in the trade union movement; opposes discrimination on the job and in unions based on sex, gender identity, gender expression, sexual orientation, race, national or ethnic origin, age, disability, religion or political views; encourages LGBTQIA+ workers to register and vote to exercise their full rights and responsibilities of citizenship at the local, state and national levels; and educates the union movement and the public about the economic and social needs and interests of LGBTQIA+ workers.

PAW also helps educate union members on larger political questions of importance to the LGBTQIA+ community, such as gender identity-anti-discrimination protections and marriage equality.

Nationally, PAW led the struggle for domestic partnership benefits, an issue important to LGBTQ+ couples and non-married heterosexuals. PAW has also recently undertaken an initiative to advocate for health care benefits for the special needs of transgender workers.

== Staff ==
The current staff includes Brittany Anderson as Executive Director.

== Lawsuits ==
=== Pride at Work v. Governor of Michigan ===
Pride at Work was the lead plaintiff in National Pride at Work v. Governor of Michigan, No. 05-368-CZ (55th Dist. Ct. September 27, 2005). In 2004, the state of Michigan amended its constitution to define marriage as a union between a man and a woman. After enactment of the amendment (known as Proposal 2), Michigan governor Jennifer Granholm questioned the legality of providing state-funded domestic partnership benefits. In May 2005, Pride at Work, on behalf of its members at Michigan State University and other state agencies, filed a complaint seeking to establish that the amendment does not bar public employers from providing benefits to domestic partners. Pride at Work argued in its brief that domestic partnership benefits are a contractual relationship unrelated to marital status and are not preempted by the amendment. On September 27, 2005, district court judge Joyce Draganchuk agreed, and issued summary judgment for the plaintiffs.

The state of Michigan appealed. On October 31, 2005, the Michigan Court of Appeals granted the state attorney general's motion to stay the decision and accelerate the appeal. On April 11, 2006, a panel of three Michigan Court of Appeals judges heard oral arguments on the amendment prohibiting public employers from offering domestic partner benefits.

On February 2, 2007, a unanimous three-judge panel of the state Court of Appeals ruled that the amendment bans domestic partner benefit plans. The ruling dismissed Pride at Work's claim that the amendment deprives same-sex couples of the equal protection of the law. "Consistent with the state's long public policy tradition of favoring the institution of marriage," the court wrote, "the marriage amendment's purpose, 'to secure and preserve the benefits of marriage for our society and for future generations of children...' is neither arbitrary nor invidious on its face." Pride at Work immediately appealed the ruling.

On May 7, 2008 the Supreme Court of Michigan interpreted the state's 2004 constitutional amendment providing that only different-sex unions may be "recognized as a marriage or similar union for any purpose." The court ruled that the statute prohibited public employers from offering health insurance benefits to employees' same-sex domestic partners because domestic partnerships are "similar unions" to marriage.

== See also ==
- List of LGBT-related organizations
- LGBT rights in the United States

== Bibliography ==
- Badgett, M.V. Lee. Money, Myths, and Change: The Economic Lives of Lesbians and Gay Men. Chicago: University of Chicago Press, 2001.
- Bain, Christian A. "A Short History of Lesbian and Gay Labor Activism in the United States." In Laboring for Rights: Unions and Sexual Diversity Across Nations. Gerald Hunt, ed. Philadelphia, Pa.: Temple University Press, 1999.
- Bellant, Russ. The Coors Connection: How Coors Family Philanthropy Undermines Democratic Pluralism. Boston, Mass.: South End Press, 1991.
- Bullough, Vern L. Before Stonewall: Activists for Gay and Lesbian Rights in Historical Context. Florence, Ky,: Psychology Press, 2002.
- Bylaws - Pride at Work, AFL-CIO As amended September 20–21, 2003.
- Cartwright, Donna. "Protecting Lesbian, Gay, and Transgender Members." Labor Notes. May 29, 2008.
- D'Emilio, John (2003). Lost prophet: Bayard Rustin and the quest for peace and justice in America. New York: The Free Press. ISBN 9780684827803.
- Fairchild, Betty and Hayward, Nancy. Now That You Know: A Parents' Guide to Understanding Their Gay and Lesbian Children. San Diego, Calif.: Harcourt Brace, 1998.
- Frank, Miriam. "Lesbian and Gay Caucuses in the U.S. Labor Movement." In Laboring for Rights: Unions and Sexual Diversity Across Nations. Gerald Hunt, ed. Philadelphia, Pa.: Temple University Press, 1999.
- Friedman, Monroe. Consumer Boycotts: Effecting Change Through the Marketplace and the Media. Florence, Ky.: Psychology Press, 1999.
- Guide to the Stephen R. Blair Papers, 1919-1996. University of Washington.
- Harbeck, Karen M. Gay and Lesbian Educators: Personal Freedoms, Public Constraints. Malden, Mass.: Amethyst Press, 1997.
- Harris, William H. "A. Phillip Randolph, Black Workers, and the Labor Movement." In Labor Leaders in America. Melvyn Dubofsky and Warren R. Van Tine, eds. Urbana, Ill.: University of Illinois Press, 1987.
- Heath, Robert L. and Palenchar, Michael J. Strategic Issues Management: Organizations and Public Policy Challenges. Los Angeles: Sage Publications, 2009.
- Hunt, Gerald. "What Can Be Done? Sexual Diversity and Labor Unions in Perspective." In Laboring for Rights: Unions and Sexual Diversity Across Nations. Philadelphia, Pa.: Temple University Press, 1999.
- Kates, Steven Maxwell. Twenty Million New Customers!: Understanding Gay Men's Consumer Behavior. Florence, Ky.: Psychology Press, 1998.
- Leonard, Arthur. "Partner Benefits Barred in Michigan." Gay City News. February 8, 2007.
- Levine, Daniel. Bayard Rustin and the Civil Rights Movement. New Brunswick, N.J.: Rutgers University Press, 1999.
- Miller, Neil. Out of the Past: Gay and Lesbian History From 1869 to the Present. Boston: Alyson Publications, 2006.
- National Archives and Records Administration. Our Documents: 100 Milestone Documents From the National Archives. New York: Oxford University Press, 2003.
- Noyes, Matt. "Coming Out for Union Democracy: AUD at Pride at Work." Union Democracy Review. August/September 2001.
- O'Brien, John J. George G. Higgins and the Quest for Worker Justice: The Evolution of Catholic Social Thought in America. Lanham, Md.: Rowman & Littlefield, 2004.
- Persons, Georgia A. The Expanding Boundaries of Black Politics. New Brunswick, N.J.: Transaction Publishers, 2007.
- Rimmerman, Craig A. From Identity to Politics: The Lesbian and Gay Movements in the United States. Philadelphia, Pa.: Temple University Press, 2002.
- Starr, Kevin. Golden Dreams: California in an Age of Abundance, 1950-1963. New York: Oxford University Press, 2009.
- Styrsky, Stefen. "Lesbian Assumes a Top AFL-CIO Role; Nancy Wohlforth, Active With Pride at Work, Joins Executive Committee." Gay City News. 75(37): September 15–21, 2005.
- Wolf, Sherry. Sexuality and Socialism: History, Politics, and Theory of LGBT Liberation. Chicago, Ill.: Haymarket, 2009.

=== Further reading ===
- Averill, Linda. "Blatantly Militant: The Hidden History of Queers in the U.S. Labor Movement." Freedom Socialist. 22(2): July-September, 2001. Accessed 2010-11-11.
- Fiona Colgan, Sue Ledwith, Editors. Gender, diversity and trade unions: international perspectives. Volume 6 of Routledge research in employment relations. Publisher Psychology Press, 2002
- Desma Holcomb and Nancy Wohlforth. The Fruits of Our Labor: Pride at Work. New Labor Forum No. 8 (Spring - Summer, 2001), pp. 9–20
- Wendland, Joel. "Union Members Prepare for Pride at Work Convention." Political Affairs. July 3–9, 2006. Accessed 2010-11-11.
