= Brenda Howard =

Bisexual rights activist (1946–2005)

- Born: December 24, 1946; New York City, U.S.
- Died: June 28, 2005 (aged 58); New York City, U.S.
- Organization(s): Gay Liberation Front, Gay Activists Alliance, BiNet USA, Act Up, Queer Nation and New York Area Bisexual Network
- Movement: LGBT rights movement

Brenda Howard (December 24, 1946 – June 28, 2005) was an American bisexual rights activist and sex-positive feminist. The Brenda Howard Memorial Award is named for her.

== Biography ==
Howard was born in the Bronx, New York City, and grew up in Syosset, New York, in a Jewish family. She graduated from Syosset High School and from Borough of Manhattan Community College with an Associate in Applied Science degree in Nursing.

In the late 1960s, Howard was active in the movement against the Vietnam War. In 1969 she lived in an urban commune of anti-war activists and draft resisters in Downtown Brooklyn New York. Like many other women in the US anti-war movement at the time, Howard became critical of its domination by men, and she soon became involved in the feminist movement as well.

A militant activist who helped plan and participated in LGBT rights actions for over three decades, Howard was an active member of the Gay Liberation Front and for several years chair of the Gay Activists Alliance's Speakers Bureau in the post-Stonewall era. A fixture in New York City's LGBT Community, Howard was active in the Coalition for Lesbian and Gay Rights which helped guide New York City's Gay rights law through the City Council in 1986 as well as ACT UP and Queer Nation.

Howard's activism included participation in the 1987 March on Washington for Lesbian and Gay Rights as a part of the effort led by Barry Douglas, a leader of the Gay Mens S&M Activists. Douglas began the work for inclusion in the march in 1983 through a committee first set up in GMSMA in 1983.

Howard was polyamorous. She died in 2005 from colon cancer and was survived by her partner Larry Nelson. A fellow LGBT rights activist, Marla R. Stevens, wrote in a tribute published in The Bilerico Project:

[W]e forged a bond of mutual bad girl respect...that lasted through the years, including the production of the 1993 March and the work to create Stonewall 25. I miss my colleague in crime. The worst part of growing older is that such missing grows right along with it.

== Eponymous award and tributes ==
The Brenda Howard Memorial Award was created in 2005 by the Queens Chapter of PFLAG. It was the first award by a major American LGBT organization to be named after an openly bisexual person. The award, which is given annually, recognizes an individual whose work on behalf of the bisexual community and the greater LGBT community best exemplifies the vision, principles, and community service exemplified by Howard, and who serves as a positive and visible role model for the entire LGBT community.

Howard was named by Equality Forum in 2013 as one of their 31 Icons for LGBT History Month. In 2014 the Trevor Project chose her as one of the role models for their Women's History Month project, "highlighting incredible woman-identified powerhouses who have changed the world for the better" and stating "At The Trevor Project we not only want to celebrate this month, we want to shine a light on the often unrecognized influence LGBTQ women have had, and continue to have, on our youth."

In 2015, Nelson highlighted her accomplishments in a video for the #StillBisexual campaign, which was posted online for Celebrate Bisexuality Day.

In June 2019, Howard was one of the inaugural fifty American "pioneers, trailblazers, and heroes" inducted on the National LGBTQ Wall of Honor within the Stonewall National Monument (SNM) in New York City's Stonewall Inn. The SNM is the first U.S. national monument dedicated to LGBTQ rights and history, and the wall's unveiling was timed to take place during the 50th anniversary of the Stonewall riots.

== See also ==
- Bialogue
- BiNet USA
- Bisexuality in the United States
- New York Area Bisexual Network
