= Anything That Moves =

1990s American bisexual magazine

- Summer 1999 cover of Anything That Moves
- Managing Editor: Linda Howard
- Former editors: Karla Rossi; Mark Silver
- Founder: Karla Rossi
- Founded: 1991
- First issue: Winter 1991
- Final issue Number: Spring 2001; 22
- Company: Bay Area Bisexual Network
- Country: United States
- Based in: San Francisco, California
- Language: English
- OCLC: 25244146

Anything That Moves was an American literary and journalistic magazine about bisexuality, published by the Bay Area Bisexual Network (BABN) in the United States from 1990 to 2002. The magazine aimed to confront misconceptions about bisexuality and redefine concepts of sexuality and gender. The magazine's mission was to defy stereotypes and broad definitions of bisexuals, and to combat biphobia.

== History ==
Anything That Moves was founded by Karla Rossi of the Bay Area Bisexual Network (BABN) as an expansion of the 12-page Bay Area Bisexual Network Newsletter in 1991. Rossi served as the magazine's first managing editor. In her first editorial, Rossi stated that she was motivated to start Anything That Moves to combat misconceptions about bisexuals and address issues related to bisexual erasure and oppression in heterosexual, gay, and lesbian communities. Rossi emphasized that the publication’s mission was to give bisexual people control over their own narratives and visibility. She specifically highlighted the impact of the AIDS crisis on bisexuals.

Rossi remained managing editor of Anything That Moves until 1993. The position was then briefly held by Gerard Palmeri and Tori Woodard for a special issue on spirituality and healing until it was passed to Mark Silver in 1994. Silver held the position of managing editor up until issue #16 in 1998, when it was passed on to Linda Howard (who referred to herself as the magazine's "editrix"). She held this position for the rest of the magazine's run.

The final issue of Anything That Moves was released in 2001. Overall, the BABN published 22 issues of the magazine, along with one special Pride edition published in 1999. Throughout the entirety of its 10-year run, the magazine was published by the BABN.

In 2020, a team of archivists scanned and uploaded all issues of Anything that Moves onto a free online archive.

== Structure and contents ==
Most issues of Anything That Moves centered around a theme, which changed from issue to issue. Most themes centered around such, activism, health, or spirituality, and featured essays, fiction, interviews, and artwork. Contributors were not required to claim any particular identity label in order to contribute. The magazine published feature stories, news, interviews, reviews, poetry, art, and autobiographical writing.

=== Bisexual manifesto ===
The magazine has become most notable for the lasting legacy of the ATM Manifesto, popularly called "The Bisexual Manifesto". The article "about our name…", which spearheaded the inaugural issue, described the purpose of the magazine, addressed common stereotypes and biphobic attitudes, and emphasized the diverse and individual nature of bisexuality. The text changed several times throughout the magazine's run.

"We are tired of being analyzed, defined and represented by people other than ourselves, or worse yet, not considered at all. We are frustrated by the imposed isolation and invisibility that comes from being told or expected to choose either a homosexual or heterosexual identity.

Monosexuality is a heterosexist dictate used to oppress homosexuals and to negate the validity of bisexuality.

Bisexuality is a whole, fluid identity. Do not assume that bisexuality is binary or duogamous in nature: that we have "two" sides or that we must be involved simultaneously with both genders to be fulfilled human beings. In fact, don't assume that there are only two genders. Do not mistake our fluidity for confusion, irresponsibility, or an inability to commit. Do not equate promiscuity, infidelity, or unsafe sexual behavior with bisexuality. Those are human traits that cross all sexual orientations. Nothing should be assumed about anyone's sexuality, including your own."

Anything That Moves, issue 7, Spring 1994, p. 2

== Title ==
The complete title of the magazine, Anything That Moves: Beyond the Myths of Bisexuality, was purposely chosen for its controversial nature. The title refers to the stereotype depicting bisexuals as willing to have sex with "anything that moves" and was suggested by Tom Geller, author of the book Bisexuality: A Reader & Sourcebook. In its opening statement, the magazine stated its intent to challenge negative stereotypes about bisexual people, to create dialogue and to redefine the "anything that moves" stereotype on their own terms.
