= Swannanoa, North Carolina =

Census-designated place in North Carolina, US

- Census-designated place
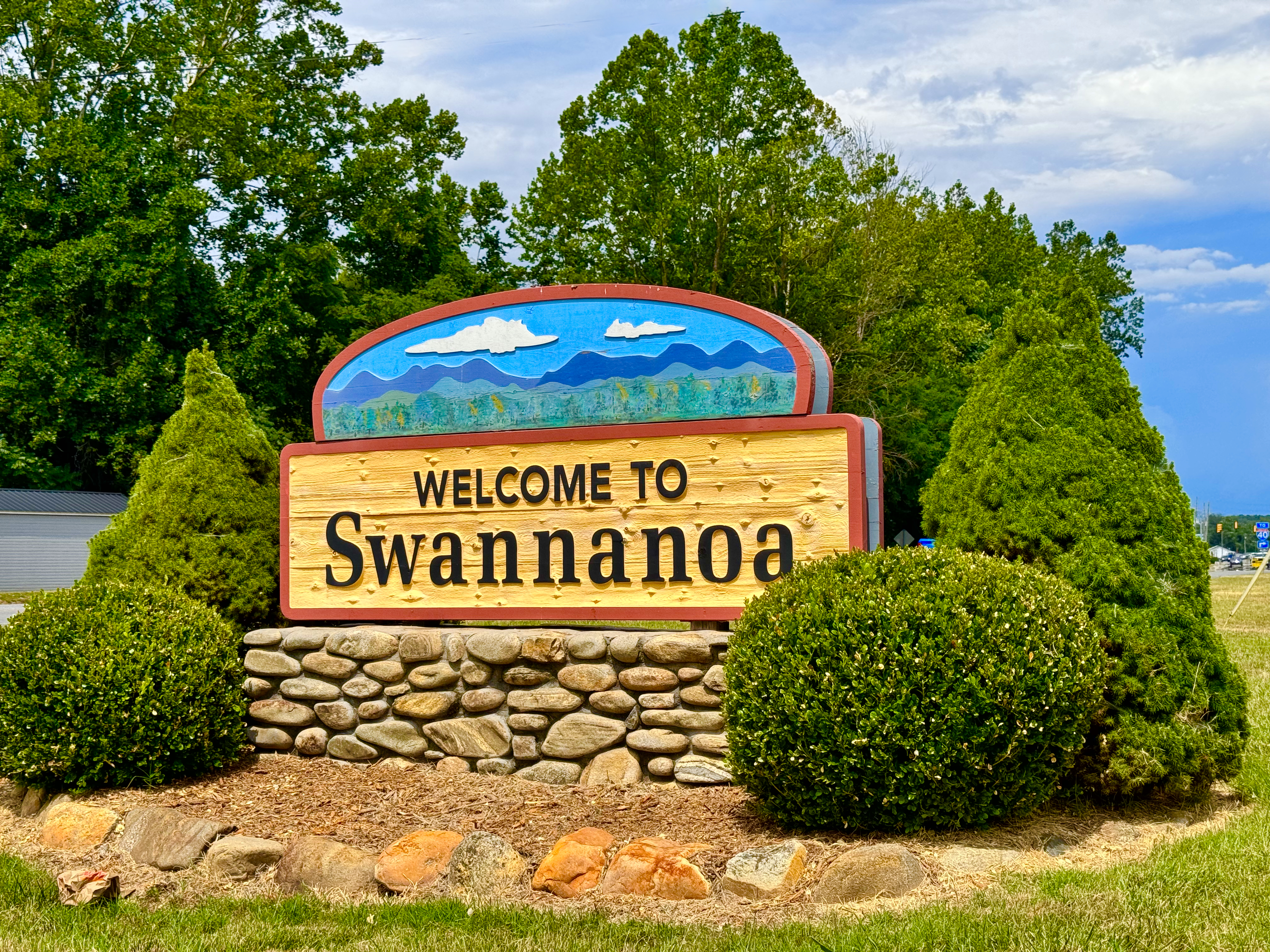
- A welcome sign on U.S. Route 70

- Location in Buncombe County and the state of North Carolina
- Coordinates: 35°36′22″N 82°22′18″W
- Country: United States
- State: North Carolina
- County: Buncombe

Area
  - Total: 6.41 sq mi (16.59 km^{2})
  - Land: 6.37 sq mi (16.51 km^{2})
  - Water: 0.031 sq mi (0.08 km^{2})
- Elevation: 2,225 ft (678 m)

Population (2020)
  - Total: 5,021
  - Density: 787.6/sq mi (304.11/km^{2})
- Time zone: UTC−5 (Eastern (EST))
  - Summer (DST): UTC−4 (EDT)
- ZIP Code: 28778
- Area code: 828
- FIPS code: 37-66280
- GNIS feature ID: 2402907

Swannanoa is a census-designated place (CDP) in Buncombe County, North Carolina, United States. The population 5,021 at the 2020 census up from 4,576 at the 2010 census. The community is named for the Swannanoa River, which flows through the settlement. It is part of the Asheville Metropolitan Statistical Area.

== History ==
Swannanoa is located several miles west of Black Mountain just prior to Oteen and eastern Asheville. The area hosts the former Beacon Blanket Mill. Alexander Inn was listed on the National Register of Historic Places in 1984.

Swannanoa also homes the Asheville Junction, a tunnel made with the forced labor of around three-thousand African American prisoners, which inspired the folk song "Swannanoa Tunnel."

In 2024, the town was severely damaged by Hurricane Helene. In January 2025, president-elect Donald Trump visited the town to survey the damage and meet survivors.

== Geography ==
Swannanoa is located in eastern Buncombe County between Asheville and Black Mountain. Interstate 40 passes through the main commercial area of Swannanoa.

According to the United States Census Bureau, the CDP has a total area of 6.4 square miles (16.7 km^{2}), of which 6.4 square miles (16.6 km^{2}) is land and 0.04 square miles (0.1 km^{2}), or 0.53%, is water.

== Demographics ==
Historical population
Census	Pop.	Note	%±
2000	4,132		—
2010	4,576		10.7%
2020	5,021		9.7%
U.S. Decennial Census

=== 2020 census ===
As of the 2020 census, Swannanoa had a population of 5,021. The median age was 40.8 years. 20.0% of residents were under the age of 18 and 18.2% of residents were 65 years of age or older. For every 100 females there were 87.7 males, and for every 100 females age 18 and over there were 84.2 males age 18 and over.

89.7% of residents lived in urban areas, while 10.3% lived in rural areas.

There were 1,894 households in Swannanoa, of which 27.0% had children under the age of 18 living in them. Of all households, 43.5% were married-couple households, 19.7% were households with a male householder and no spouse or partner present, and 27.7% were households with a female householder and no spouse or partner present. About 27.7% of all households were made up of individuals and 11.3% had someone living alone who was 65 years of age or older.

There were 2,065 housing units, of which 8.3% were vacant. The homeowner vacancy rate was 0.6% and the rental vacancy rate was 5.9%.

Swannanoa racial composition
Race	Number	Percentage
White (non-Hispanic)	3,810	75.88%
Black or African American (non-Hispanic)	232	4.62%
Native American	40	0.8%
Asian	28	0.56%
Pacific Islander	7	0.14%
Other/Mixed	267	5.32%
Hispanic or Latino	637	12.69%

=== 2000 census ===
At the 2000 census, there were 4,132 people, 1,652 households and 1,113 families residing in the CDP. The population density was 649.5 inhabitants per square mile (250.8/km^{2}). There were 1,774 housing units at an average density of 278.9 per square mile (107.7/km^{2}). The racial makeup was 91.53% White, 5.06% African American, 0.46% Native American, 0.65% Asian, 0.02% Pacific Islander, 1.21% from other races, and 1.06% from two or more races. Hispanic or Latino of any race were 2.52% of the population.

There were 1,652 households, of which 30.0% had children under the age of 18 living with them, 50.1% were married couples living together, 12.2% had a female householder with no husband present, and 32.6% were non-families. 28.6% of all households were made up of individuals, and 11.9% had someone living alone who was 65 years of age or older. The average household size was 2.34 and the average family size was 2.86.

27.9% of the population were under the age of 18, 7.4% from 18 to 24, 28.5% from 25 to 44, 22.5% from 45 to 64, and 13.6% who were 65 years of age or older. The median age was 36 years. For every 100 females, there were 103.1 males. For every 100 females age 18 and over, there were 89.0 males.

The median household income was $31,218 and the median family income was $39,980. Males had a median income of $27,561 and females $22,939. The per capita income was $16,804. About 8.5% of families and 11.4% of the population were below the poverty line, including 17.2% of those under age 18 and 12.3% of those age 65 or over.

== Government and infrastructure ==
=== Emergency response ===
Originally growing from the Beacon Fire Brigade, Swannanoa receives fire protection from Swannanoa Fire and Rescue who holds a class 2 ISO rating providing coverage out of its main station at 103 South Avenue and out of a substation at 510 Bee Tree Rd which provides fire protection, first response and, technical rescue.

=== Detention facilities ===
The North Carolina Department of Public Safety (formerly the North Carolina Department of Corrections) operates the Swannanoa Correctional Center for Women in Swannanoa. It opened on July 7, 2008, taking women previously at the Black Mountain Correctional Center for Women.

The North Carolina Department of Juvenile Justice and Delinquency Prevention formerly operated the Swannanoa Valley Youth Development Center in Swannanoa for delinquent boys, including those without sufficient English fluency. It opened in 1961.

== Education ==
=== Childhood education ===
Charles D. Owen High School provides high school education for grades 9-12 for the Swannanoa and Black Mountain Communities as well as parts of Riceville.

Community High School along with ArtSpace Charter School are also located in Swannanoa.

=== Higher education ===
Warren Wilson College is located west of the Swannanoa CDP.

== Notable people ==
- Brad Johnson was a graduate of Charles D. Owen High School. He went on to play in the National Football League for the Super Bowl XXXVII Champion Tampa Bay Buccaneers.
