= Gay and Lesbian Labor Activists Network =

U.S. non-profit organization

The Gay and Lesbian Labor Activists Network (GALLAN) is a non-profit organization of trade unionists founded in 1987 by Tess Ewing, Harneen Chernow, Susan Moir, Cheryl Schaffer, Nancy Marks, Gerry Thomas, Tom Barbara and Diane Fry and a few other members of Boston's LGBTQ community. GALLAN's main purpose was to support LGBTQ rights and oppose homophobia in the workforce, as well as push its unions to campaign for anti-discriminatory measures and benefits packages. GALLAN started as a series of potluck dinners and discussions, and later hosted events for the community in partnership with labor unions to campaign for LGBTQ rights in Massachusetts.

GALLAN helped to form the national organization Pride at Work in 1994, which became a constituency group of The American Federation of Labor and Congress of Industrial Organizations (AFL–CIO) in 1997. Today, GALLAN is considered a local chapter of Pride at Work.

== Mission ==
In one of their early flyers, GALLAN stated their mission was to raise lesbian and gay issues within organized labor and to bring labor issues to the LGBTQ community at large. The organization believed that both movements could be strengthened by recognizing that homophobia and oppression of working people are linked, and many of the two struggles are intertwined. They listed the similarities between the movements as the following:

- specific protection for lesbian and gay workers has been won by many unions in collective bargaining agreements.
- gay workers are otherwise protected from arbitrary treatment by employers by "just cause" agreements in union contracts.
- employment policies that discriminate against the LGBTQ community hurt all workers by creating divisions, making workers as a class weaker than they need to be.
- Many unions such as SEIU and AFSCME have been in the forefront of AIDS education and the fight to prevent discriminatory work policies. National gay/labor coalitions have developed and have successfully worked together in Boston, New York City, and San Francisco to fight against anti-gay and anti-labor initiatives by The Heritage Foundation and the Coors interests.

== Activities and outreach ==
GALLAN hosted many events in order to educate the community about LGBTQ issues and support their cause. Events and activities included marching at Gay Pride parades, building coalitions with LGBTQ groups, working on referendum campaigns, supporting union organizing drives, providing education to unions, and attending rallies and providing strike support.

The Gay and Lesbian Activists Network held regular networking events in Boston for members, called Gay and Lesbian Labor Activists Networking Today (GALLANT). On flyers for the event, they defined the word "gallant" as "1. Show or gay in appearance; 2. High-spirited and courageous." GALLANT started by hosting meetings/potluck events to help "bring gay issues to the labor community and labor issues to the gay community." GALLAN also participated in larger national events, such as the Celebration of Labor Solidarity, which took place in October 1987 in Washington D.C. This event honored the mutual support between the Lesbian and Gay Movement and the U.S. Labor Movement, and featured speakers from labor unions across America, as well as Barney Frank, a U.S. Congressman at the time.

=== Allies for the 90s ===
GALLAN held many events to raise awareness and fundraise for their cause as well as related organizations. In October 1989, GALLAN hosted a highly successful event with Cesar Chavez, President of the United Farm Workers union (UFW), titled "Allies for the 90's: United for Health". The event was held at the union building, New England Life Hall. The benefits of the event support UFW as well as the Fenway Community Health Center, a center that has a history of working to meet the health needs of the local LGBTQ community. The Fenway Community Health Center was fundraising in order to build a new building. They originally planned to use union labor and shortly before the benefit reneged on the agreement and announced they would use non-union labor. The event was featured in The Labor Page, a news publication for Boston area workers, as well as many other local LGBTQ publications. The article spotlighted GALLAN's uniting with UFW, and was the first form of media publicity that GALLAN received since its inception.

=== Committee to Defeat the Anti-Gay Referendum ===
In 1990, GALLAN helped form the Committee to Defeat the Anti-Gay Referendum. The referendum sought to rescind the Gay/Lesbian Civil Rights Bill that was passed in 1989 after a 17-year struggle. The bill prohibited discrimination on the basis of sexual orientation in employment, housing, public accommodations and credit. GALLAN was one of the organizations that helped form the Steering Committee, which worked to defeat the Anti-Gay Referendum. The Steering Committee publicized the campaign against the referendum, held focus groups to get a sense of public opinion on the referendum, helped organize rallies and bring in speakers, and supported the defeat of the anti-gay referendum in any way possible. The repeal did not end up going through.

=== Pride at Work ===
Pride at Work was founded in 1994 with the help of GALLAN. Pride at Work is a nonprofit organization and an officially recognized constituency group of the American Federation of Labor & Congress of Industrial Organizations (AFL–CIO). Pride at Work organizes support between the labor movement and the LGBTQ community for social and economic justice. Pride at Work has a national chapter as well as over 20 local chapters across the country. GALLAN is considered to be Boston's chapter of Pride at Work.

== See also ==
- List of LGBT-related organizations and conferences
- List of unions affiliated with the AFL–CIO
