= Queer Student Cultural Center =

The Queer Student Cultural Center is the current incarnation of the coming out, gay, lesbian, bisexual, transgender, genderqueer, intersex, and allied communities organization of the University of Minnesota campuses that has been active since May 1969 (under various names).

== History ==
Upon its creation, QSCC was named "The Association of GLBT Student Organizations and Their Friends" upon its inception in 1994 at the University of Minnesota. The group was created by Dave McPartlin and founded by the President of the University Gay Community (Dave McPartlin), the co-presidents of the University Bisexual Community (Jage Miller and Jonas Duca) and a co-facilitator of the University Lesbians (Susanna de Campos Salles) overseen by adviser Doug Halverson. The group was later renamed The Queer Student Cultural Center in 1998.

Approved by the Minnesota Student Association and then University President, Nils Hasselmo, and Vice-President of Student Affairs, Marvalene Hughes, the Association was one of the earlier student groups to get University funding to combat homophobia and tackle issues specific to LGBTQ students.

The University Bi Community formed as an offshoot of the University Gay Community by Dave McPartlin in 1991, along with the University People of Color and University International Students as a way to reach the growing needs of the student population. Co-chaired leadership of the University Bi Community was taken on by Jage Miller and Jonas Ducat immediately after its inception.

In 1982, the University Gay Community and University Lesbians were formed as two separate groups from their predecessor group entitled "Fight Repression of Erotic Expression" (FREE), founded by Koreen Phelps and Stephen Ihrig on May 18, 1969. This group began after the duo started teaching a free University course on the West Bank on The Homosexual Revolution, causing it to become the first queer student group in America.

In 1971, an original officer of FREE, Jack Baker, was the first openly gay man elected student body president at a major university. By winning this election he became the first openly gay man to win any public office in the U.S. In 1970, Jack Baker and Mike McConnell also became the first gay couple to seek legal marriage and were featured in Life magazine. Jack was also re-elected in 1972.

== Important influences ==
QSCC/ULGC/FREE has helped accomplish many historically important things for the LGBT community including:

- Electing the first openly gay student body president, Jack Baker in 1970
- Challenging the homophobia of the student body president in 1989 and requesting his removal.
- Spearheading the removal of ROTC on campus in 1989
- First openly lesbian student body president, Suzanne Denevan, elected in 1990
- National recognition by sports department of 'Gay Day' in 1990
- University recognition of LGBT needs by granting office space and funding in 1990

== Names over the years ==
- 1969: Fight Repression of Erotic Expression (FREE).
- 1972: Minnesota Gay Activists.
- 1973: University Community Gay Association.
- 1977: Minnesota Lesbian Gay Community.
- 1982: separated into University Lesbians and University Gay Community.
- 1991: Association of Gay/Lesbian/Bisexual Student Organizations and Their Friends (AGLBSOTF) formed from the groups:
  - University Gay Community.
  - University Lesbians.
  - University Bisexual Community.
  - Delta Lambda Phi Fraternity.
  - GLBT International Students.
  - GLB Medical Students.
  - GLBT Students of Color.
  - Heterosexuals Unafraid of Gays (HUGS).
- 1998: Queer Student Cultural Center (QSCC).

== See also ==
- List of LGBT community centers
