= Global LGBTQIA+ Employee & Allies at Microsoft =

Organization

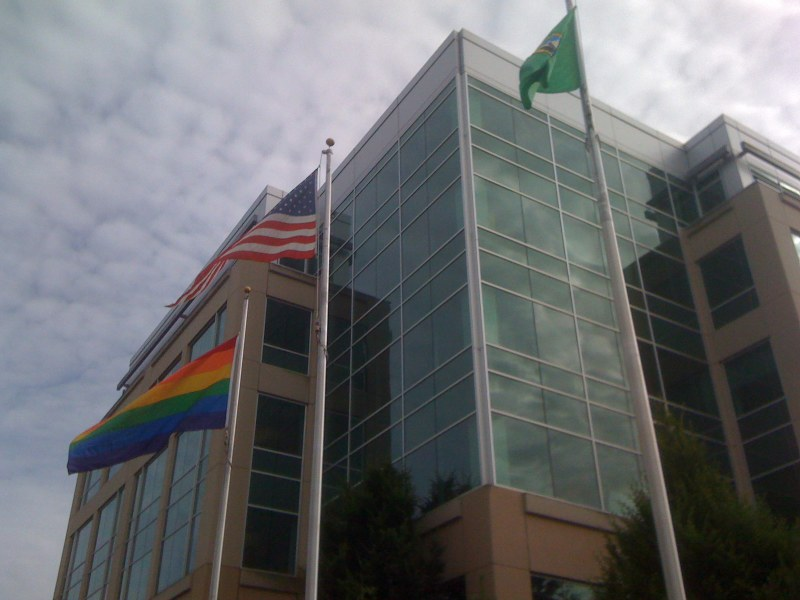
Gay pride flag flying in front of the Sammamish campus

Global LGBTQIA+ Employee & Allies at Microsoft (formerly Gay and Lesbian Employees At Microsoft) (GLEAM) refers to the Microsoft employee resource group comprising LGBTQIA+ employees along with straight allies. GLEAM originated as a private mailing list during the 1980s. Members of the list successfully campaigned for sexual orientation to be added to Microsoft's anti-discrimination policy in 1989. In 1997, group leaders pointed out that anti-gay actions had occurred, but "overt bias is extremely rare."

GLEAM also lobbied for Microsoft to offer insurance and other benefits to same-sex domestic partners. Lobbying intensified after Lotus Development offered these benefits to its workers. Microsoft added this benefit in 1993.

GLEAM became more formally organized in 1993 under Microsoft's Diversity Advisory Council, along with Blacks at Microsoft (BAM), the women's group – known as Hoppers – and other similar groups.

More recently, the group influenced Microsoft to add gender identity and expression to its anti-discrimination policies in April 2005 and, in 2006, to progressively extend health coverage benefits to cover transgender care. Since this time, the Human Rights Campaign has Microsoft's Corporate Equality Index rating – a set of metrics to measure a company's compliance with its goals of gender identity neutrality in the workplace – to 100%.

== Washington state gay rights legislation ==
GLEAM also pushed to secure Microsoft's support of gay rights legislation in Washington state. During legislative hearings on Washington's H.B. 1515 bill, which would extend the state's current anti-discrimination laws to people with alternate sexual orientations, two Microsoft employees testified as private citizens on behalf of the legislation. A conservative religious group took this to mean Microsoft was actively supporting the legislation as an organization and demanded the company reverse its support.

In an April 22, 2005 e-mail, company CEO Steve Ballmer explained to Microsoft employees that earlier in the year, the company had decided to focus its lobbying efforts on issues more directly related to its core business (e.g., computer privacy). In the same e-mail, he affirmed the company's commitment to diversity and encouraged individual shareholders to get involved in the issue, but said that no one on either side should represent themselves as speaking for the company.

In response, seven days later, the GLEAM board of directors sent an e-mail that proposed, with specific timelines, various steps that Microsoft should take in order to repair its public image and the "lack of trust" created by the Ballmer e-mail on April 22. Among the proposals was that Microsoft should acknowledge its neutral position was a mistake (including a proposed press release and a seven-day suggested timeframe for the dissemination of the release) and partner with GLEAM as "subject matter experts" in reaching out to the LGBT community, beginning with a sixty-day "intense outreach" period. Meanwhile, a petition of employees asking Microsoft to support the bill topped 1700 signatures.

The bill was passed in the subsequent legislative session (2006) under the leadership of gay legislator, Rep. Ed Murray (D) of the 43rd legislative district and after the defection of Republican State Senator, Bill Finkbeiner, who subsequently retired and whose seat was captured by Democrat and Microsoft alumnus, Eric Oemig. During the 2006 elections, voters of the 43rd legislative district also elevated Rep. Ed Murray to the Washington State Senate.

On September 15, 2009, Microsoft publicly announced its support for Referendum 71 to protect Washington State Domestic Partnerships.

== See also ==
- LGBT employees at Google
- GLIFAA, organization representing LGBT persons in U.S. foreign affairs agencies and entities
