= Alexander Inn (Swannanoa, North Carolina) =

- U.S. National Register of Historic Places
- Nearest city: Swannanoa, North Carolina
- Area: 4 acres (1.6 ha)
- Built: c. 1820
- NRHP reference No.: 84001932
- Added to NRHP: May 31, 1984

Alexander Inn was a historic inn located near Swannanoa, Buncombe County, North Carolina. The original section was built about 1820, and was a small log structure. With later expansions and additions, it became a rambling two-story log and frame structure. It has been demolished.

It was listed on the National Register of Historic Places in 1984.
