= Gayglers =

Term for LGBT employees of Google

A variant of the Google logo, representing their LGBT employees, known as Gayglers.

Gayglers is a term for the gay, lesbian, bisexual and transgender employees of Google. The term was first used for all LGBT employees at the company in 2006, and was conceived as a portmanteau between "Google", the company they worked for, and "gay", a term referring to homosexual men, and by extension, LGBTQ people. In 2021, the employee resource group was renamed Pride at Google to be more inclusive.

== See also ==
- Gay and Lesbian Employees at Microsoft
- GLIFAA, organization representing LGBT persons in U.S. foreign affairs agencies and entities
