= Fifty Shades of Gay =

Bangalore-based LGBTQ+ organisation

Fifty Shades of Gay (saiouma.) is a Bangalore-based LGBT organisation. It was started in 2016 by social activist and founder of Laudco Media, Shubham Mehrotra to raise awareness about the LGBT population. In 2017, the team was operating across 24 states in India, China, Germany, Canada, Australia, the US, and the UK. The organisation publishes news and stories about the LGBT community, organises events and campaigns, and offers support in crises.

== Campaigns and events ==
- India's First Drag Queen Race
- #Iamnotacriminal (Featured MGWI Sushant Digvikar and Anwesh Sahoo)
- #IamAlly

== See also ==
- List of LGBT-related organizations and conferences
- LGBT rights in India
- LGBT rights in Asia
