= Ski Bums =

Travel and social club for LGBT skiers and snowboarders

Ski Bums was a travel and social club for LGBTQ skiers and snowboarders, with hundreds of members from across North America. It hosted social events and group trips to ski resorts throughout North America, South America and Europe.

== History ==
Ski Bums was founded in New York City in December 2003. The club began hosting trips in 2005. Ski Bums began with local daytrips from New York City, but within two years, began traveling to ski resorts throughout the American West. Ski Bums offered year-round vacations to ski resorts in the Northern and Southern Hemispheres, visiting mountains throughout North America, South America and Europe.

== Social events ==
Ski bums hosted Avalanche, a party for its members and friends, at therapy, a gay bar in New York City. In the fall of 2009, Ski Bums expanded its social events to include Washington D.C., Los Angeles, Chicago, San Francisco, Salt Lake City, Denver, Atlanta and Minneapolis. In the fall of 2012, it began hosting events in London, United Kingdom. In addition, Ski Bums hosted a series of charity fund-raising events each year.

== Trips ==
To date, Ski Bums has hosted trips to Vail, Telluride, Steamboat Springs and Aspen, Colorado, Zermatt, Switzerland, Whistler-Blackcomb, British Columbia, Jackson Hole, Wyoming, Chamonix and Courchevel France, St. Anton am Arlberg Austria, Bariloche, Argentina, Park City, Utah, and Salt Lake City, Utah, (Alta, Snowbird, Brighton, Solitude, Snowbasin), Lake Tahoe, California (Heavenly, Kirkwood and Squaw Valley), Big Sky, Montana and several resorts in Vermont, including Killington, Stratton, Stowe, and Mount Snow. It also hosts a regular season of local bus daytrips (to Hunter Mountain, Windham, Mountain Creek and Belleayre).

== See also ==
- List of LGBT-related organizations
- LGBT tourism
