= Free Speech Union =

British organisation

The Free Speech Union
- Formation: 24 February 2020; 6 years ago
- Founder: Toby Young
- Type: Nonprofit advocacy
- Legal status: Active
- Headquarters: London, United Kingdom
- Members: 50,000 (2026)
- Website: freespeechunion.org

The Free Speech Union (FSU) is a British membership organisation, founded in 2020 by Toby Young, whose stated aim is to campaign for freedom of speech and to defend the speech rights of its members. In 2026, the FSU was reported to have about 50,000 members.

== History ==
The Free Speech Union was founded in 2020 by social commentator Toby Young to campaign for freedom of speech and to counter cancel culture. The FSU describes itself as non-partisan, although some outlets have said it is conservative, libertarian-right, or alt-right aligned.

In September 2022, PayPal shut down the accounts of the Free Speech Union and Toby Young due to alleged breaches of PayPal's acceptable use policy, believed to relate to alleged misinformation about COVID-19 vaccines. Following public backlash and criticism, PayPal reversed its decision a few days later, reinstating the accounts and issuing an apology.

In January 2026, the Free Speech Union had its website hacked by the direct action group Bash Back. Bash Back said that the FSU "works to protect transphobes, racists and anti-choice activists". Records of donations over £50 to the FSU were published on the websites of Bash Back and whistleblowing organisation Distributed Denial of Secrets. In response to the leak, the FSU temporarily took down its website and obtained an emergency High Court injunction banning the publication of its donors' details. The records have been removed from the Bash Back website but were accessible on the Distributed Denial of Secrets website as of February 2026. On 13 January Toby Young made a speech in the House of Lords about the incident. He said that the Free Speech Union was the victim of an attack by Bash Back and called them "a militant pro-trans 'direct action' group". Young spoke in favour of Amendment 370A that would create a category titled "Extreme Criminal Protest Groups", including Bash Back, with their supporters being subject to imprisonment of up to 3 years and/or a fine.

In 2026, the FSU's chief operating officer Sigrun Olafsdottir resigned after allegations that she behaved in a "hostile" manner to staff members and had said that she would 'never hire a black person', during a staff meeting.

== Lobbying actions and campaigns ==
The FSU has written letters to several universities to criticise no-platforming, and has also lobbied against the Hate Crime and Public Order (Scotland) Bill. In a submission to the public consultation, prepared by law professor Andrew Tettenborn of Swansea University, the FSU claimed that the bill would be one of the most draconian constraints on free speech in the Western world.

In Byline Times, Nafeez Ahmed said that Birkbeck College professor Eric Kaufmann, an advisor to the FSU, was behind Education Secretary Gavin Williamson's proposal to regulate free speech at English universities. Ahmed found that the Free Speech Champions project was connected to Spiked and the Charles Koch Foundation. Digital sociologists writing in Race & Class linked the Free Speech Union in a network analysis to thirteen other campaign groups sharing staff and members that were part of a "war on woke" and centered on Spiked.

In 2024, the FSU advised Lucy Connolly not to plead guilty over an X post in which Connolly said, "set fire to all the fucking hotels full of the bastards for all I care," referring to Muslim asylum seekers, who had wrongly been blamed on social media for recent murders of children in Southport. The sentencing judge said the tweet was "intended to incite serious violence". The FSU also helped fund Connolly's appeal.

== Legal actions ==
As of October 2025, the FSU has been involved with more than 4,500 cases. Results have ranged from written apologies to a £500,000 payout at industrial tribunal.

In October 2020, a director of the FSU announced that the Union had begun a lawsuit against Ofcom over its March 2020 coronavirus guidance, which was published simultaneously with the UK lockdown. The guidance "warns broadcasters to exercise extreme caution before criticising the response by the public health authorities or interviewing any sceptics." The FSU director claimed that the guidance was the reason for the lack of public discussion of the Great Barrington Declaration. A judge dismissed the case and the FSU had to pay £16,732 to cover Ofcom's costs.

In November 2021, the FSU announced that it would be taking legal action against Essex University. The previous year, an independent review commissioned by the university had found that the university had failed to uphold free-speech in its treatment of two female professors, who hold contentious views about transgender people, in December 2019. The university later apologised to both professors. The FSU argued that the university failed to act on the recommendations of the review and stated in their pre-action letter that it is in breach of free-speech law.

After Cambridge University launched an online portal for students to anonymously report microaggressions, the Free Speech Union threatened legal action. The portal was later removed.

In September 2021, the Free Speech Union crowdfunded around £25,000 for the legal fees of a train conductor who had been dismissed by West Midlands Trains for a Facebook post including the comment "I don't want to live in some sort of alcohol-free Muslim caliphate just to beat Covid-19". The conductor received compensation from West Midlands Trains.

In September 2025, the FSU assisted Graham Linehan by providing lawyers after he was arrested at Heathrow Airport over X posts. In October of the same year the police dropped their probe against Linehan, who subsequently sued the Metropolitan Police for wrongful arrest with the help of the FSU, who instructed lawyers on his behalf. The Metropolitan Police ultimately paid Linehan a settlement of £25,000 and publicly apologised for "the considerable distress caused to Mr Linehan".

The FSU funded the successful appeal of Hamit Coskun, who had been convicted of a religiously aggravated public order offence for shouting Islamophobic statements while burning a copy of the Quran outside the Turkish embassy, in what was reportedly a protest against the government of Recep Tayyip Erdoğan.

== Leadership ==
In addition to Young, directors of the union have included Douglas Murray, Inaya Folarin Iman, and Nigel Biggar.

The Legal Advisory Council of the FSU consists of sixteen lawyers, among them law professor Raymond Wacks.

The Media/PR Advisory Council consists of several journalists including Julia Hartley-Brewer and Allison Pearson, as well philosopher Arif Ahmed.

The FSU Advisory Board includes politician Jim Sillars.
