= North Carolina Department of Juvenile Justice and Delinquency Prevention =

Agency overview
- Jurisdiction: State of North Carolina
- Website: North Carolina Department of Juvenile Justice and Delinquency Prevention

The North Carolina Department of Juvenile Justice and Delinquency Prevention (DJJDP) was a state agency of North Carolina, headquartered in Raleigh. The agency operates juvenile corrections facilities in the state. It is now a part of the North Carolina Department of Public Safety.

== History ==
The Executive Organization Act of 1971 created the Department of Social Rehabilitation and Control. In 1974 the name was changed to the Department of Corrections.

== Facilities ==
The department operates four youth development centers (YDCs) and nine youth detention centers. The YDCs are state-oriented correctional facilities that provide educational and vocational courses to youth. A youth who is of age 10 or older may be committed to a YDC for a minimum of a six-month stay. The average stay of a youth in YDC is about 375 days (1 year and 10 days). The 1998 Juvenile Justice Reform Act states that only serious offenders, violent offenders, and chronic offenders may be ordered to attend YDCs. The public at times has confused the YDCs with the youth correctional facilities operated by the North Carolina Department of Correction. The detention centers are regional correctional facilities that temporarily house juveniles before they receive final placement or before they go to trial. The detention centers provide services to all counties except Durham, Forsyth, Guilford, and Mecklenburg, which operate their own regional youth detention centers.

=== YDC ===
The juvenile section has the following juvenile long-term commitment facilities, called "youth development centers":

- Stonewall Jackson Youth Development Center near Concord - Serves boys
- C. A. Dillon Youth Development Center in Butner - Serves boys
- Chatham Youth Development Center in the Central Carolina Business Park in Siler City - Houses girls and boys - Opened in 2008
- Dobbs Youth Development Center - Near Kinston - Serves boys, opened in 1944

Girls were previously housed at the Samarkand Youth Development Center (YDC) near Eagle Springs. The 60-acre (24 ha) complex first opened in 1918 and did not have a fence.

Swannanoa Valley Youth Development Center in Swannanoa held delinquent boys, including those without sufficient English fluency. It opened in 1961.

=== Youth detention centers ===
The youth detention centers are:

- Alexander Juvenile Detention Center
- Buncombe Regional Juvenile Detention Center
- Cumberland Regional Juvenile Detention Center
- Gaston Regional Juvenile Detention Center
- New Hanover Regional Juvenile Detention Center
- Perquimans Juvenile Detention Center
- Pitt Regional Juvenile Detention Center
- Richmond Juvenile Detention Center
- Wake Juvenile Detention Center

The county-operated centers are the Durham County Youth Home, the Forsyth County Youth Services Center, and the Guilford County Juvenile Detention Center.

== See also ==
- Government of North Carolina

== Works cited ==
- Cheney, John L. Jr., ed. (1981). North Carolina Government, 1585-1979: A Narrative and Statistical History (revised ed.). Raleigh: North Carolina Secretary of State. OCLC 1290270510.
