= Boston Alliance of Gay, Lesbian, Bisexual, and Transgender Youth =

Non-profit organization

BAGLY
- Founded: 1980; 46 years ago
- Legal status: 501(c)(3) nonprofit organization.
- Purpose: BAGLY aims to create, sustain, and advocate for socially just programs, policies, and services for LGBTQ+ youth through youth-led and adult-supported efforts.
- Headquarters: 28 Court Square, Boston, MA
- Key people: Grace Sterling Stowell
- Website: www.bagly.org

The Boston Alliance of Gay, Lesbian, Bisexual, and Transgender Youth (BAGLY) is a non-profit organization located in Boston that works to protect, expand, and raise awareness for the rights of gay, lesbian, bisexual, transgender, queer, and questioning youth (LGBTQ+). Founded by LGBTQ+ youth in 1980, it adopts a youth-led, adult-supported approach to better meet the varied needs of a wide demographic of LGBTQ+ youth in Greater Boston. BAGLY's stated goals are to create, sustain, and advocate for socially just and intersectional programs, policies, and services for the LGBTQ+ youth community, which they achieve through frequent community-based leadership development, health promotion, and social support programs.

== History ==
Founded in 1980, BAGLY originated from the Committee of Gay Youth, a Boston-based youth and adult advocacy group established to provide safe meeting spaces for LGBTQ+ peoples. Dissatisfied with youth representation on the mostly adult leadership board, former CGY members branched off from the organization to create the Boston Alliance of Gay and Lesbian Youth (later renamed the Boston Alliance of Gay, Lesbian, Bisexual, and Transgender Youth) and provide specific services for youth 22 and under. Using funds raised from CGY and other independent fundraisers, BAGLY organized multiple programs such as the BAGLY Speakers Bureau, HIV/AIDS education, and the first prom for LGBTQ+ youth in the United States early on in its development. BAGLY was also a founding organization of the National Youth Advocacy Coalition and the Massachusetts Governor's Commission on Gay and Lesbian Youth.

BAGLY is currently the oldest independent and continuous LGBTQ+ youth organization in Boston. In addition to its Speaker Bureau, BAGLY Prom, and sexual health education, BAGLY has also expanded to include Youth Pride, the Trans Youth Summit, and New England Awards Ball, as well as a multitude of weekly youth-oriented programs developed by youth leaders. Companies such as Puma and Glossier have collaborated with BAGLY in the past to support and keep programs such as physical and mental health services free and accessible for LGBTQ+ youth. In the past, BAGLY has also worked with GLAD (Gay & Lesbian Advocates & Defenders) and the Massachusetts Transgender Political Coalition to create programs and initiatives, receiving the support of activists such as Laverne Cox.

== Programs ==
=== Youth programs ===
BAGLY provides a variety of weekly meetings and drop-in workshops to address the intersectional needs of youth in the Greater Boston area. Meetings and workshops are held in the community center, which also serves as a safe place for LGBTQ+ youth to work on schoolwork, socialize, and relax. BAGLY posts a monthly calendar of meetings on its website.

Generally, there are three types of sessions: Social Support Meetings, which offer support for LGBTQ+ youth under 22 with other marginalized identities; BAGLY Wednesdays, which contain an orientation followed by weekly rotations between Arts Corner, Outspoken Open Mic, Family Dinner, and HEARRT (Health Education & Risk Reduction Team); and Underground Fridays.

=== Youth leadership ===
BAGLY provides opportunities for youth leadership through two main pathways: the Youth Leadership Committee and HEARRT. The Youth Leadership Committee is composed of seven youths and is responsible for organizing prominent BAGLY outreach events such as Youth Pride, Boston Pride, and AIDS Walk, as well as other advocacy initiatives. HEARRT, which contains five youths, works with the BAGLY clinic on HIV prevention and sexual health awareness to improve health outcomes for LGBTQ+ youth.

=== Training and workshops ===
The BAGLY Speakers Bureau is a youth speaker bureau founded in 1981 that works with institutions that primarily affect the lives of LGBTQ+ youth, such as schools and youth organizations, to bring awareness to their experiences and needs.

=== The BAGLY Clinic ===
BAGLY's clinic is open and free of charge to any LGBTQ+ individuals under 29. Services provided include STI testing, healthcare and insurance referrals, and other healthcare applications for HDAP, name changes, food stamps, cash benefits, and more.

Four forms of therapy are also offered free of charge to LGBTQ+ youth under 25 at BAGLY; similar to the BAGLY Clinic, they do not require proof of insurance or identification. Therapy includes group counseling on trauma, creative art narration, meetings with licensed independent clinical social workers, and peer-led meetings on mental health issues.

=== AGLY Network ===
The AGLY Network contains organizations affiliated with BAGLY and dedicated to advocating for and helping LGBTQ+ youth all over Massachusetts. There are currently fourteen AGLY organizations in Massachusetts: BrAGLY, CIGSYA, Generation Q North, Generation Q South, House of Colors/Casa de Colores, LOLYP, McVAGLY, nAGLY, NB-AGLY, Out Now, Safe Homes, SShAGLY, SWAGLY, and Out MetroWest, Inc. The network is supported by BAGLY, both through funding and HEARRT training.

== Events ==
=== Youth Pride ===
With 25 years of history, BAGLY's Youth Pride is held annually in May and includes a youth-led march, performances by LGBTQ+ youth, dance parties, and more.

=== BAGLY Prom ===
BAGLY Prom is the oldest LGBTQ+ youth prom in the nation. Featured in photography by Zoe Perry-Wood and a Time article in 2012, the dance continues to be one of the largest LGBTQ+ youth gatherings in the country.

=== Trans Youth Summit ===
The Transgender Youth Summit was formed by BAGLY and the Massachusetts Transgender Political Coalition in 2008 for transgender/nonbinary/genderqueer youth under 24, featuring activities for community-bonding and workshops on identity and available resources

== See also ==
- List of LGBT-related organizations
