= Grace Gospel Chapel =

Church in Seattle, Washington, U.S.

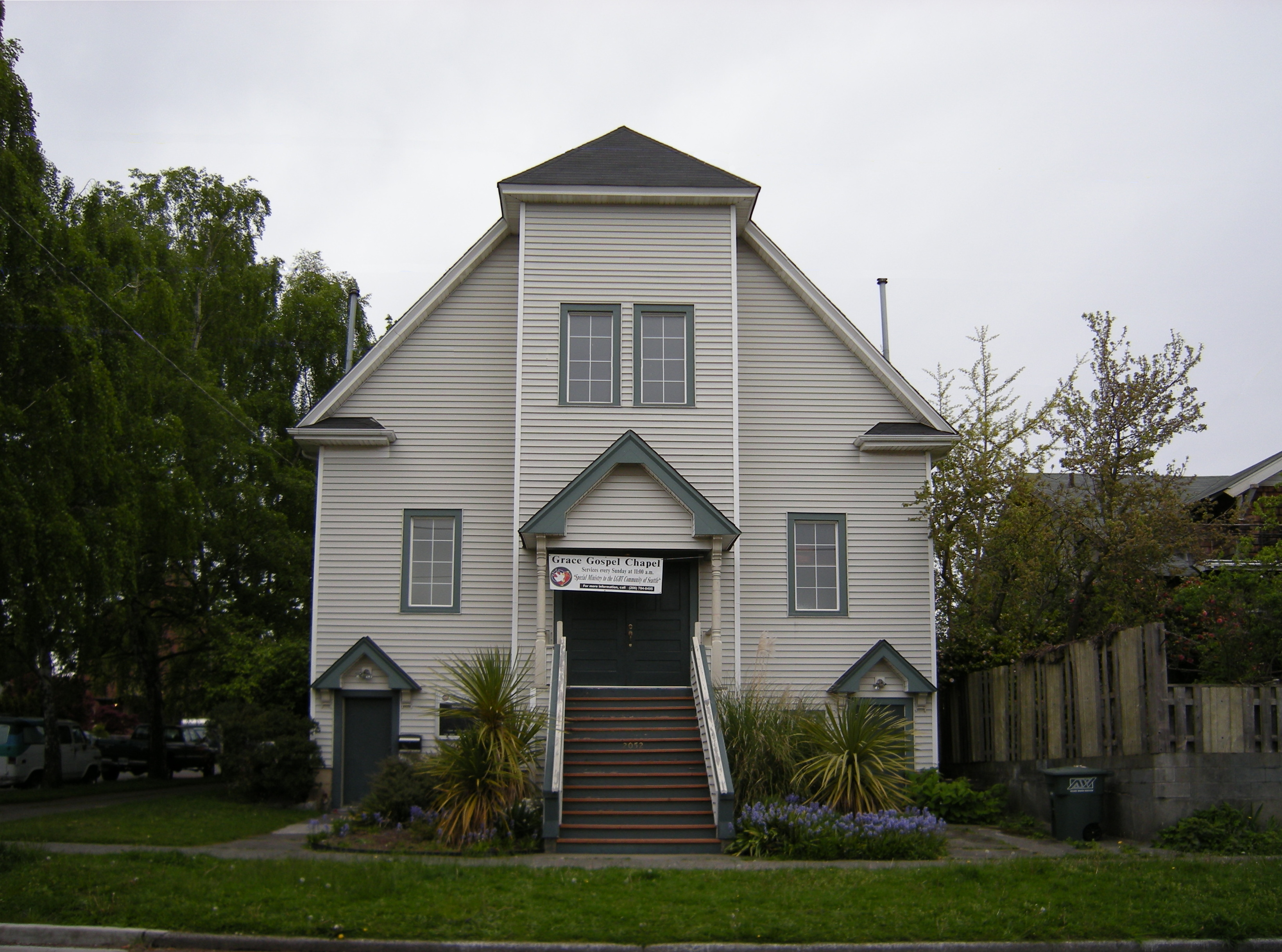
- Grace Gospel Chapel
- 47.6755°N 122.3845°W
- Location: Ballard, Seattle, WA
- Country: United States
- Denomination: Non-denominational
- Churchmanship: Evangelical
- Website: Official website

History
- Status: Church
- Founded: 1977
- Founder: Vic Van Campen

Architecture
- Completed: 1906

Clergy
- Pastor: Thom Poochigian

Grace Gospel Chapel was an Evangelical Christian church in the Ballard neighborhood of Seattle, Washington. When it was founded in 1977 by Rev. Vic Van Campen, the church's congregation was mostly gay and lesbian. Grace Gospel was the first Evangelical gay and lesbian church in the nation not affiliated with the Metropolitan Community Church (MCC), with MCC being founded in Huntington Park, California, eight years before Grace Gospel Chapel.

== See also ==
- LGBT-affirming Christian denominations
