= Queercircle =

Queer arts organisation in London (2021–)

- Formation: 2021; 5 years ago
- Founder: Ashley Joiner
- Type: Charity
- Purpose: LGBTQ+, Art
- Headquarters: Greenwich, London
- Website: queercircle.org

Queercircle is a charitable organisation describing itself as "working at the intersection of arts, health and social action". It aims to showcase the work of LGBTQ+ artists, and to create systemic change for LGBTQ+ people through an expansive programme that includes exhibitions, offsite commissions, discussion groups, support groups, research, residencies and mutual learning.

== History ==
Queercircle was founded by Ashley Joiner. From 2016, it first existed as a website and residency platform, but in 2021 became a registered charity and found a physical home in the Design District, Greenwich, London.

The organisation has several trustees, including artist Isaac Julian and actor Russell Tovey.

== Work ==
Exhibitions and off-site commissions
Year(s)	Title	Artist(s)	Location
2021	There Can Be No Love Without Justice	Bex Wade, Kgotlelelo, Bradley Sekiti, Black Lodge Press	Across the UK
2021	Videovirus	AA Bronson, General Idea	Across the UK
2022	The Queens’ Jubilee!		Queercircle
2022	Let Me Hold You	Michaela Yearwood-Dan	Queercircle
2022	Tunnel Visions	Bones Tan Jones	Queercircle
2023	Ogoni 9	Chiizii	Queercircle (library)
2023	Dust Bathers	Rafael Pérez Evans	Queercircle
2023–2025	The River in Verse	Marwan Kaabour	Public work at the Greenwich Peninsula, London
2022–2027	Many Mikl Mek Ah Mukl	Zinzi Minott	Queercircle
2023	Clocking Off	Rafał Zajko	Queercircle
2024–2026	Mil Veces un Instante	Teresa Magrolles	The Fourth Plinth, Trafalgar Square, London
