= Lambda Foundation =

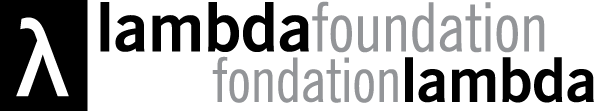
- Predecessor: Lambda Business and Professional Group
- Type: NGO
- Registration no.: 862758448 RR0001
- Legal status: Charitable organization
- Headquarters: Ottawa, Ontario, Canada
- President: Cameron Aitken
- Website: lambdafoundation.org
- Formerly called: Lambda Literary and Scholarship Foundation

The Lambda Foundation (French: Fondation lambda), officially the Lambda Scholarship Foundation Canada, is a registered Canadian charity with the mission of creating scholarships, awards, and bursaries in support of 2SLGBTQ+ studies, and education and awareness, in advancement of equality and human rights.

Lambda Foundation is governed by a national Board of Directors.

== History ==
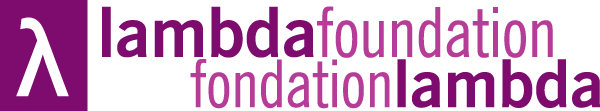

For many years, Lambda operated as a spin-off project from an unincorporated club, Lambda Business and Professional Group. The Lambda Business and Professional Group sought charitable status and eventually underwent a name change to Lambda Foundation for Excellence, and its fundraiser, Wilde About Sappho, was one of Canada's largest literary activities.

After establishing five scholarships in partnership with five universities, Lambda incorporated under the name Lambda Literary and Scholarship Foundation - Lambda Foundation being the short version.

SInce the Lambda Foundation received charitable status in 2003, its activities having grown into education and research. It changed its name to Lambda Scholarship Foundation Canada but is still known in short form as the Lambda Foundation/Fondation Lambda.

== Scholarship Programme ==
=== Universities ===
Lambda Foundation's Scholarship Programme is the first Canadian series of national, annual university scholarships in 2SLGBTQ+ research in all fields. To date, scholarships have been established a number university campuses including: Carleton University, Concordia University, Université de Montréal, Guelph University, University of Manitoba, University of New Brunswick, University of Ottawa, University of Victoria, McMaster University, and Laurentian University. There is also a Doctor Gary Gibson Award at Saint's Paul's Hospital Foundation/UBC in Vancouver, and the Friends of Lambda scholarship at the University of Saskatchewan, College of Law (Foster Prize in Human Rights).

Each university selects candidates and projects, based on academic merit and relevance to the LGBT community. Students meeting these criteria are welcome to apply to the participating university, regardless of sexual orientation, gender or any other grounds.

=== High Schools ===
Expanding beyond universities, Lambda worked with local community leaders in 2007 to establish awards for high school students at Gulf Islands Secondary School on Salt Spring Island, British Columbia.

=== Scholarship/award recipients ===
Lambda Foundation scholarships have been awarded to a wide range of students in arts, literature, social sciences and other sciences, professional schools and secondary schools. The awards highlight the value of 2SLGBTQ+ studies to both the 2SLGBTQ+ community and more broadly. A listing of recipients can be found at the Lambda website.

== Other forms of support ==
With the assistance of the Canada Council for the Arts and Carleton University, Lambda sponsored a Writer-in-Residence, Ivan Coyote, at Carleton University during 2007-2008.

In December 2008 Lambda supported an education and research initiative with Queer Peace International to co-produce the publication Breaking Free: Sexual Diversity and Change in Emerging Nations, which examines ways in which sexual/gender minorities in developing countries empower themselves, educate their communities on gender and sexuality differences, and work collaboratively with international allies.

== See also ==
- List of LGBT organizations
