= Trans Homos DZ =

Algerian LGBTQIA+ rights organization

Trans Homos DZ is an Algerian organization that advocates for the rights of LGBTQI+ communities in Algeria. Since its creation, the NGO has been working to document violence against LGBT+ people and to implement strategies to protect the community. Additionally, it provides victims with support, whether related to their health concerns, legal procedures, or social integration. The organization leads numerous campaigns denouncing violations against Algerian women and LGBTQ+ communities.

== Values ==
The stated purpose of Trans Homos DZ is to spread equality and to protect diversity while opposing discrimination based on gender, sexual orientation, sex, social class, culture, belief, or religion. The organization assists anyone who is in need of support. The organization denounces patriarchy and sexism in Algeria and advocates for intersectionality.

== History ==
In 2016 the group campaigned in collaboration with the Egyptian NGO Bedayaa, in the Nile Valley Area (Egypt and Sudan).

It partnered with Mesahat where the women discussed lesbian, bisexual, and transexual women from Sudan, Egypt, and Algeria. They used the slogan "Strength Lies in Our Unity... One Region... One Struggle" to advocate for solidarity.

Trans Homos DZ participated in an online campaign, alongside many partner organizations, to support the International Day Against Homophobia and Transphobia. Trans Homos DZ published a booklet with personal stories and testimonies of victims from the LGBTQ+ communities from North Africa.

Trans Homos DZ collaborates with religious institutions and leaders such as imams and researchers, with the goal of proliferating peaceful religious speeches that are inclusive and encourage tolerance among followers. Trans Homoz DZ partnered with Franco-Algerian doctor and imam Ludovic-Mohamed Zahed and with the French organization Homosexuels Musulmans de France, also known as Musulmans Progressistes de France.

In 2017, Zak Otsmane, a refugee and member of Trans Homos DZ, was reportedly attacked in Marseille by two former legionaries, who were later indicted for the assault.

== See also ==
- Official website
- Publications
