= Bash Back =

British transgender rights group

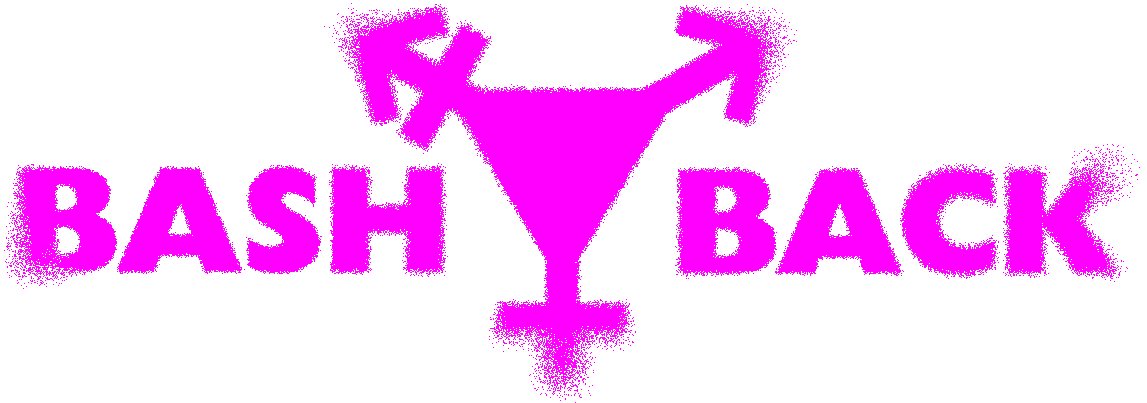
- Formation: 2025
- Location: United Kingdom
- Methods: Direct Action, Vandalism
- Website: https://www.transbashback.com/

Bash Back is a direct action group which aims to promote trans rights in the United Kingdom.

== Actions ==
Bash Back first emerged when they took credit for vandalising the constituency office of Labour Party MP and Secretary of State for Health and Social Care Wes Streeting, during the night of 31 July 2025. Streeting had been responsible for an indefinite ban on provision of puberty blockers via the NHS from December 2024, and had previously met with members of the Bayswater Support Group, an anti-transgender organisation endorsing conversion therapy.

On 10 October 2025, Bash Back claimed responsibility for acts of vandalism, including broken windows and graffiti, at the Brighton Centre before the FiLiA conference started. The group declared the beginning of a 'new era of trans rage' against events they perceived as hostile to trans safety. Bash Back specifically criticised speakers such as Julie Bindel and organisations including LGB Alliance for their perceived anti-trans rhetoric which, in their view, contributes to violence against transgender individuals. The vandalism occurred amidst increasing tensions between the gender-critical movement and trans activism in the United Kingdom, particularly concerning debates over sex-segregated spaces.

The group performed a similar action against the Equality and Human Rights Commission's London headquarters on 31 October 2025, claiming that the commission is a 'hate group' and calling for 'businesses, universities and sports organisations [to] dump the EHRC’s hateful guidance'.

=== FSU donor data leak ===
In January 2026, Bash Back hacked the website of the membership organisation Free Speech Union and published records of donations over £50. The group said that the FSU "works to protect transphobes, racists and anti-choice activists".
