= Casa Chama =

Brazilian LGBTQ rights organization

- Established: 2018
- Headquarters: São Paulo, Brazil
- Fields: LGBTQ rights
- Key people: Matuzza Sankofa and Digg Franco (founders)
- Website: www.casachama.org

Casa Chama is a civil society organization that provides assistance to trans people in São Paulo. It was co-founded by Matuzza Sankofa and Digg Franco in 2018. The organization advocates for the rights of the trans people in Brazil, and provides legal, healthcare, housing, and other assistance to the community. While the organization struggled to sustain itself financially, the Trans–Casa Chama endowment fund was established in 2023 to support the organization.

== History ==
Casa Chama was co-founded by Matuzza Sankofa and Digg Franco in 2018 to provide assistance to transgender and transvestite people in the Brazilian city of São Paulo.

In 2021, Casa Chama was at risk of closing due to a lack of financial support. In 2023, Leonardo Letelier, founder and CEO of Sitawi Finanças do Bem, an organization that develops innovative financial solutions for positive social and environmental impact, created the Trans–Casa Chama Fund, the country's first endowment fund focused on LGBTQIA+ issues, an initiative designed to ensure Casa Chama's long-term financial sustainability.

== Works ==
Casa Chama advocates for the rights of the trans people in Brazil, while denouncing the human rights violations experienced by this community. The organization provides legal, healthcare, housing, employment, cultural, educational, and safety related assistance.

In 2020, Casa Chama provided housing aid to about 70 people and helped 250 others receive ongoing medical care through a partnership with UBS – Centro de Saúde Escola Barra Funda (Barra Funda Teaching Health Center). In 2021, Casa Chama provided assistance to 350 people, of whom 90% were from São Paulo and 85% were living in situations of severe social vulnerability. During the COVID-19 pandemic, the organization provided more than 2,000 assistance services to ensure that trans people could exercise their rights. As of 2021, the organization was estimated to have reached approximately 183,000 people through both direct and remote initiatives.
