= New York Area Bisexual Network =

Bisexual group in the New York area

New York Area Bisexual Network (NYABN) is a central communications network for bisexual and bi-friendly groups and resources in the five boroughs (Brooklyn, the Bronx, Manhattan, Queens and Staten Island) of New York City and the surrounding Tri-State area. The mission of the New York Area Bisexual Network is to facilitate the development of a cohesive bisexual community in the New York Area. The network promotes bisexual visibility, works to protect the bisexual community from discrimination and biphobia and assists and empowers the individual community members, their families and friends to live full, rich, safe and happy lives.

NYABN provides listings of groups, events and general information of interest to the local bisexual community as well as providing links to Regional, National and International Groups and Events on its website and phone-line. Additionally NYABN has a Bisexual Speakers Bureau, coordinates the Bisexual-Information Phone-Line, keeps up the Bisexual Community PO Box, works with Bialogue an NYC based bisexual activist/political group, hosts various groups, meetings and events of interest to the entire bisexual community, helps new groups form and coordinates arrangements for the Bisexual Contingent(s) at NYC's annual LGBT PrideFest and Parade each June. NYABN began having regular meetings and engaging in PrideFest activities virtually in 2020 due to the COVID-19 pandemic.

== History ==
After the Stonewall riots in June 1969 Brenda Howard, a bisexual woman who had previously been active in the anti-war and feminist movements, both organized a rally one month after the riots and then co-ordinated the very first Gay Pride in June 1970, commemorating the first anniversary of Stonewall. Howard continued to be active in the LGBTQ community in New York during the 1970s and 1980s whilst the bisexual community in the Tri-State area of New York, New Jersey and Connecticut grew larger, more active and more diverse. In the 1980s regional bisexual networks started to form such as Boston's highly successful East Coast Bisexual Network, now the Bisexual Resource Center and the Bay Area Bisexual Network. In 1987 Howard was involved in setting up the New York Area Bisexual Network.

== See also ==
- Bisexual Resource Center
- Bisexual American history
- Bisexual community
