= Adodi =

Black gay men's organization in the US

- Founded: 1986
- Founder: Clifford Rawlins
- Type: Nonprofit organization
- Legal status: Active
- Purpose: Support and community for same-gender-loving men of African descent
- Region served: United States

Adodi is one of the oldest Black gay organizations in the United States. It was founded in Philadelphia in 1986 by Clifford Rawlins to bring together same-gender-loving men of African descent. Since its founding, Adodi has become one of the oldest movements of same-gender-loving men of African descent in history. It organized retreats for Black gay men partially to grieve during the early AIDS epidemic and partially to heal together. By 2003, the group had chapters in dozens of cities and suburbs. The organization currently has chapters in Detroit, Chicago, Philadelphia, New York, Dallas, and Washington, DC, many of which have regular programming and annual retreats.

Adodi is often referred to as the plural of "ado", a Yoruba word to describe "a man who 'loves' another man"; however, Yoruba has no form of pluralizing words by adding suffixes.
