= GLIFAA =

- Abbreviation: GLIFAA
- Formation: 1992
- Purpose: Lesbian, gay, bisexual and transgender (LGBT) employee organization for the US State Department, USAID and other foreign affairs agencies in the US government.
- Website: www.glifaa.org

GLIFAA ( originally the Gays and Lesbians in Foreign Affairs Agencies) is the officially recognized organization representing lesbian, gay, bisexual and transgender (LGBT+) personnel and their families in the United States Department of State, USAID, Foreign Commercial Service, Foreign Agricultural Service, and other foreign affairs agencies and entities within the U.S. Government. GLIFAA was founded in 1992 by employees who faced official harassment and loss of job security due to their sexual orientation. The organization has grown to include hundreds of Foreign Service, Civil Service, and contract personnel in Washington, D.C. and the United States as well as U.S. embassies and missions around the world. Members also include retirees and straight allies in government agencies, while other supporters are affiliate members.

GLIFAA is known for successfully pressing for the issuance of a non-discrimination policy by Secretary of State Warren Christopher in 1994 and eliminating barriers for obtaining security clearances with regard to entry and employment in the U.S. Foreign Service and Civil Service. Additionally, the organization worked to improve the situation for domestic partners of LGBTQ U.S. Foreign Service personnel serving overseas. GLIFAA has met with Secretaries of State Colin Powell, Condoleezza Rice, and Hillary Clinton.

== History ==
=== Background ===
In the 1950s and 60s, the "Lavender Scare", which was linked to the McCarthy-inspired campaign against perceived communist sympathizers, regularly and negatively affected sexual minorities in the U.S. government. This discrimination occurred through the early 1990s, when homosexuality was grounds for exclusion from the U.S. Foreign Service (diplomatic corps) and many positions in the Civil Service.

The first publicly gay U.S. ambassador was Ambassador to Luxembourg James Hormel, who was appointed by President Clinton and sworn in by Secretary of State Madeleine Albright in 1999. Hormel was admitted into his position through a recess appointment, without confirmation of the U.S. Senate. The second publicly gay U.S. ambassador, and the first publicly gay Foreign Service officer to be appointed as ambassador, was U.S. Ambassador to Romania Michael E. Guest, who was appointed by President George W. Bush and in 2001 sworn in by Secretary of State Colin Powell. Bush also appointed publicly gay physician Mark R. Dybul as the United States Global AIDS Coordinator, with the rank of ambassador. In December 2009, Vice President Joseph Biden swore in publicly gay lawyer David Huebner, as U.S. Ambassador to New Zealand and the Independent State of Samoa.

=== Advocacy and efforts ===
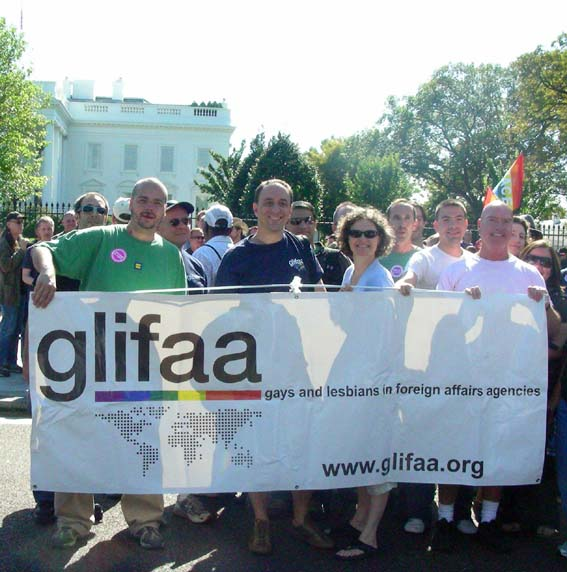
GLIFAA members at the White House in 2009

In January 2009, GLIFAA handed a letter signed by 2200 foreign affairs employees to Secretary of State Clinton, requesting that a number of key benefits be extended to same-sex domestic partners of LGBT personnel at the State Department and other foreign affairs agencies. The organization noted that these were benefits that could be accorded without violating the Defense of Marriage Act, which sharply curtails the ability of the U.S. federal government to assist LGBT families in some ways.

In May 2009, an internal State Department memo extended a number of benefits to the same-sex partners of American diplomats, including: diplomatic passports; use of medical facilities at overseas posts; medical and other emergency evacuation; transportation between posts; and training in security and languages.

In June 2009, President Obama signed a memorandum announcing these changes as well as a number of other benefits for same-sex partners of government workers. Many of the new benefits had come from GLIFAA's initial proposals.

GLIFAA has held numerous events in Washington and at U.S. embassies around the world. Speakers at GLIFAA events in Washington have included openly gay Congressman Jim Kolbe and Judy Shepard, mother of slain gay student Matthew Shepard. In June 2010, Secretary of State Clinton and USAID Administrator Rajiv Shah spoke at a GLIFAA-sponsored event at the main State Department building on the topic of "LGBT Human Rights and U.S. Foreign Policy." At the event, Secretary Clinton stated that the U.S. government would take a more assertive role in protecting the rights of LGBT people and communities around the world.

In October 2009, GLIFAA won the Out and Equal Workplace Award for its advocacy efforts.

== Members ==
- Ted Osius, one of the founding members, became U.S. Ambassador to Vietnam in 2014.
- Robert S. Gilchrist, former president of GLIFAA, became U.S. Ambassador to Lithuania in 2020.

== See also ==
- LGBT rights in the United States
- List of LGBT rights organizations
