= Kind Space =

LGBTQ community centre in Ottawa, Ontario, Canada

- Formation: 1984
- Type: community centre
- Legal status: Active
- Location(s): 400 Cooper Street, Suite 9001; Ottawa, ON K2P 2N1
- Region served: National Capital Region (Canada)
- Executive director: Carling Miller
- Volunteers: 100+
- Website: kindspace.ca

Kind Space (formerly known as PTS - Pink Triangle Services) is an LGBTQ community centre located in Ottawa, Ontario, Canada. They are the oldest registered LGBTQ-specific charity in Canada, becoming registered in 1984. The organization serves gay, lesbian, bisexual, transgender, Two-Spirit, non-binary, queer, questioning, intersex, asexual, QTBIPoC (queer, trans, black, indigenous, people of colour), of all ages within the National Capital Region. They provide a number of services including support groups, education, research, advocacy and community space.

== Organization history ==
One of the founding members of Kind Space (PTS), Barry Deeprose in 2002 wrote a history of the organization. The forwards starts off:

In 1984 a group of directors from the Board of Gays of Ottawa set out to create a non-profit organization with charitable status called Pink Triangle Services in the hopes that such recognition would enable an organization to more-easily raise funds. In the spring of that year the corporation was founded and was granted charitable status under the Income Tax Act, a first for Canada. In the ensuing fifteen years Pink Triangle Services (or PTS as it quickly became known) has flourished and grown, in many ways fulfilling the vision of the founding members.

Those fifteen years also brought tremendous changes to the gay and lesbian community. AIDS decimated a generation of gay men, while at the same time in Canada gays and lesbians won legal rights of which an earlier generation scarcely dreamed. I have had the privilege of being associated with PTS from the beginning and it remains close to my heart. There is no doubt in my mind that it continues to provide much-needed services to the gay, lesbian, and bisexual community.

Until the 2000s Kind Space was run by a working Board of Directors and was funded primarily by individual donations from those communities. Starting in the 2000s the organizational structure changed to become a policy and governance Board of Directors while the first agency executive director was hired.

Another major change that occurred in the 2000s was more focus was attributed to less served members of the community including bisexuals, trans people and those who solely identify as queer. This was also influenced by the decrease of stigma towards gays and lesbians in the broader community that lead to a court ruling making same-sex marriage in Ontario legal in 2003. A bisexual women's group started at KInd Space which evolved into BiAmore for bisexuals of all genders years later. And in 2004 Trans Youth Ottawa started a group for transgender and transsexual youth and young adults which ran until 2009 and Gender Quest a group for all trans adults started in 2005 and still operates today. In 2005 the board of directors added trans, two-spirit and queer to the letters patent to state their official commitment to those communities.

=== Rebranding and Restructuring ===
After years of financial troubles which resulted in the temporary layoff of the organizations executive director, Kind Space began to restructure the organization and repair its reputation. In 2015, Kind Space won a $100,000 rebranding package from Stiff and changed its name from Pink Triangle Services - PTS to Kind Space. Following the rebranding, the organization partnered with Planned Parenthood Ottawa to share office space. In 2017, the organization celebrated being debt free for the first time in several years.

== Programs and services ==
The programs of Kind Space offers support, education, and resource programs.

=== Support programs ===
Historically flagship programs of Kind Space are peer support groups. Over the years Kind Space has seen many groups come and go based upon need. Current support groups include:

- QTY – Queer Trans Youth: A peer-led discussion and support group for LGBTTQIA youth, ages 25 and under.
- Cafe Q: A low-pressure hangout space, participants enjoy them during board games, video games, and lounging on couches.
- High School Student Alliance: Focused on empowering youth to make systemic change within schools, that is reflective of their needs as queer and trans youth.
- The Men's Group: This peer-led social group is for men of all ages, cultures, abilities, and orientations.
- QPoC-It: A space to celebrate the diversity of our cultures and have our voices speak out about the concerns of QTBIPoC
- Polybilities: This is an open forum for exploring relationship dynamics beyond the standard societal norms.
- BiAmore: A comfortable space to gather and talk about issues related to being bisexual, pansexual, bi-curious and questioning.
- Gender Quest: This is a diverse, peer-led support group for those at any stage of transition.
- Ace/Aro Spectrum: For anyone questioning their identity as asexual, aromantic, demisexual, demiromantic, greysexual, or elsewhere within the spectrum.

=== Educational programs ===
Historically, Kind Space has focused on education and advocacy work since its founding. Financial troubles have previously restricted Kind Space's education program, however the program has recently been revitalized. Skills for the Revolution, a grassroots, peer-led program aimed at empowering and equipping is aimed at helping queer and trans communities build knowledge and hands on experience of fundamental life, advocacy, and community-building skills to deconstruct oppressive structures. This program centres healing, emotional, and restorative justice.

=== Resource programs ===
Kind Space offers several resources:

- Dr. Kelly McGinnis Library, which offers a large selection of queer and trans specific literature.
- Space Rentals
- Celebrating Self
- Support in accessing other community resources
- Referrals
- Letters Of Support – Refugee Hearings
- Manajiwin – Body-Positive Fitness
