= National Gay Prisoners Coalition =

The National Gay Prisoners Coalition was founded in the early 1970s by Charles C. Wheeler, an inmate at Washington State Penitentiary in Walla Walla, Washington during this time. Wheeler formed the coalition after realizing that, unlike other minority groups, LGBT+ people did not have a major organization in U.S. prisons to protect their interests and safety within the prison walls. Thus, Wheeler decided to form what he believed was the first LGBT+ prisoner rights organizations in Washington.

Wheeler himself experienced discrimination based on his transgender status, and he was inspired to protect the safety of other LGBT+ inmates who faced discriminatory practices and violence at the hands of prison administration. Of the violent and discriminatory treatment that Wheeler hoped to resist, LGBT+ inmates faced situations like solitary confinement, loss of privileges, and extended sentences solely due to the status of their gender or sexuality.

During the 1970s, the N.G.P.C. inspired other incarcerated people in the U.S. to create their own LGBT+ organizations. For example, in the Southern Ohio Correction Facility at Lucasville, Ohio, a Free Discussion Group was founded to nurture greater understanding and unity between the facility's LGBT+ community as well as other residents of the facility. Further, two gay inmates, John Gibbs and Ernest Valenzuela, attempted to create a chapter of the N.G.P.C. at the Federal Penitentiary in Leavenworth, Kansas. These two men faced great resistance and violence from prison officials for their attempt to form the chapter, including being forced into solitary confinement and being denied food for as long as 9 days.
