= Pride Foundation =

LGBT philanthropic foundation

- Founder: Allan Tonning
- Type: LGBT philanthropic foundation
- Purpose: Scholarships, grants, fellowships and initiatives
- Location(s): 2014 East Madison Street; Suite 300; Seattle, WA 98122
- Region served: Pacific Northwest, U.S.
- Key people: Kris Hermanns, Executive Director
- Employees: 17
- Website: pridefoundation.org

The Pride Foundation is an LGBTQ philanthropic foundation in the Pacific Northwest. It was founded in 1985, and has issued over $8 million in grants and over $1.65 million to the more than 50 scholarships it manages. In 1993, when The Pride Foundation first began granting scholarships it partnered with the Greater Seattle Business Association (GSBA) to collaborate on a joint application process.

== History ==
The Foundation's first president was Allan Tonning, a small businessman who donated $1.2 million, dying just a year after helping set up the organization.

In 1995, the Foundation was part of a shareholder proxy initiative which convinced McDonald's Corporation to extend its non-discrimination policy to include sexual orientation. In March 2000, the initiative convinced General Electric to include orientation in both its policy and its diversity training program.

On February 24, 2008, Pride Foundation announced that former Microsoft employee Ric Weiland (d. 2006) had bequeathed $65 million to support gay rights and HIV/AIDS organizations - the largest-ever single bequest for the LGBT community. Through his estate, Weiland established a fund at the Pride Foundation that will provide $46 million over the next eight years to 10 national LGBT and HIV/AIDS organizations that he personally selected and $19 million directly to Pride Foundation for their scholarships and grants supporting the Northwest's LGBT community. Weiland, one of the first five people to work at Microsoft, was a Foundation Board member for several years.

On December 10, 2009, the Foundation was given a Seattle Human Rights Award for its advocacy for the LGBT community.

== See also ==
- LGBT rights in the United States
- List of LGBT rights organizations
