= Bialogue =

American queer activist group

Bialogue, a portmanteau of the words bisexual and dialogue, is an American activist group that started in New York City, working on issues of local, national, and international interest to the bisexual, fluid, pansexual, queer-identified communities and their allies. Bialogue's mission is to dispel myths and stereotypes about bisexuality, address biphobia and bisexual erasure, educate the public on the facts and realities of bisexuality and advocate for the bisexual community. Its slogan is "Taking Action not just Offense".

== History ==
Bialogue was founded in 2005 and is the merger of two older New York City–based activist/political groups: BiPAC and the Coalition for Unity and Inclusion.

Founded in 1989, BiPAC (short for the "Bisexual Political Action Committee") was an explicitly militant activist political group dedicated to confronting and eradicating biphobia and bisexual erasure. In addition to working on issues exclusive to New York City bisexual community, BiPAC also worked in conjunction with other New York City LGBTQ and progressive groups of their day including ACT UP, Queer Nation, Irish Lesbian and Gay Organization, Children of the Rainbow, Por Los Niños, and the Coalition for a District Alternative (CoDA).

The Coalition for Unity and Inclusion (founded in 2000) was a coalition of bisexual and transgender activists who drew support from reform-minded directors of the more traditional LGBT organizations, liberal politicians as well as the grassroots bisexual and transgender community. They used such tactics as letter writing campaigns, petition drives and an innovative "feedback campaign" to achieve their goals.

The original impetus for founding both BiPAC and the Coalition for Unity and Inclusion was to combat instances of blatant biphobia within the larger New York City LGBTQ community. Bialogue, which emerged in response to the flap over the 'Bailey Study' which attempted to invalidate bisexuality itself, has always worked closely with such established bisexual organizations as BiNet USA, the Bisexual Foundation and the Bisexual Resource Center as well as mainstream LGBTQ groups such as GLAAD.

== See also ==
- Brenda Howard
