= Bay Area Bi+ & Pan Network =

Bi+/pan organization

Bay Area Bi+ & Pan Network (BABPN), previously known as Bay Area Bisexual Network (BABN), is a social and networking group in the San Francisco Bay Area. It is the oldest and largest bisexual group in the San Francisco Bay Area. Since 1987 BABN has welcomed people who are just coming out or new to the area to have opportunities to meet and talk with other bisexuals and pansexuals.

== History ==
Founded in 1987, BABN was the successor to the San Francisco Bisexual Center, which closed in 1985. Its founding was inspired by the 1987 East Coast Bisexual Network Conference, and it was founded by Lani Ka'ahumanu, Ann Justi and Maggi Rubenstein. For nearly 10 years, BABN coordinated a speaker's bureau, a newsletter, retreats, and monthly cultural and educational forums. BABN's phone line offered one of very few ways for isolated bisexuals to find and connect with the bisexual community. Bi-Friendly was founded by BABN in 1988 as a way for bisexual and bi-friendly people to meet and socialize outside of bars and activist meetings. The group sponsored brunches, trips to the redwoods, movies, plays, baseball games, etc. BABN is holding Bi-Friendly meetings as of 2012. In June 2019, BABN changed its name to Bay Area Bi+ & Pan Network (BABPN).

They were the publisher of Anything That Moves magazine during its run from 1990 to 2002.

== Services ==
BABN provides support to the bisexual community, including a website and links to resources. BABN also has two email lists: One low-volume, moderated list for events of interest to the bisexual community, and a second, unmoderated list for open discussion.

For hundreds of bisexual people, the email lists are their only contact to the bi community. BABN also has social networking groups on Facebook, tribe.net, and others. A calendar of events is the most-used feature of the BABN website.

== See also ==
- BiNet USA
- American Institute of Bisexuality
- Bisexual Resource Center
