= Timeline of LGBTQ Mormon history in the 2020s =

This is a timeline of LGBTQ Mormon history in the 2020s, part of a series of timelines consisting of events, publications, and speeches about LGBTQ individuals, (Note: LGBTQ is an initialism for lesbian, gay, bisexual, transgender and queer or questioning which functions as an umbrella term broadly referring to all sexualities, romantic orientations, sex characteristics, and gender identities that are not heterosexual, heteroromantic, cisgender, or endosex.) topics around sexual orientation and gender minorities, and the community of members of the Church of Jesus Christ of Latter-day Saints (LDS Church).

== Timeline ==
=== 2020 ===
- January – Gay Latter-day Saint Crossroads was published by Evan Smith, a Latter-day Saint bishop, and edited by Marci McPhee. The book addresses LGBTQ questions from a scripture-based Latter-day Saint perspective.
- January – The Utah Division of Occupational and Professional Licensing implements a statewide ban on conversion therapy for minors, with public support from the church. A previous version of the ban was proposed and received public opposition from the church, which in a public statement said that the ban “fails to protect individual religious beliefs and does not account for important realities of gender identity in the development of children.”
- February – A Walk in My Shoes by Ben Schilaty was published by Deseret Book. The author, a gay therapist and former Brigham Young University (BYU) administrator, answers questions frequently asked of him as a gay Latter-day Saint.
- February – The church released the new version of its leadership handbook, General Handbook: Serving in The Church of Jesus Christ of Latter-day Saints. It defines gender as "biological sex at birth" and states that any kind of gender transition—whether that includes a change of name or pronouns, "elective medical or surgical intervention," or even gendered dress—will bring about "Church membership restrictions" until the person ceases their gender transition. Transgender people may enter temples and attend meetings, but certain restrictions will apply, such as the ineligibility of transgender men for the priesthood. At the same time, the handbook reflected the previously announced policy regarding children of same-sex couples, now allowing these children to be blessed and baptized without limitations that previously existed.
- February – BYU released an updated honor code intended to align with the church's new handbook. The previous honor code specifically noted prohibiting hand-holding and kissing between same-sex couples. The updated honor code does not contain the section about "homosexual behavior." The school, however, clarified that "Even though we have removed the more prescriptive language, the principles of the Honor Code remain the same." The clarification prompted large protests by BYU students.
- March – A chapter of Affirmation was established by students and faculty at BYU–Hawaii. Later that year Iese Wilson, a music education major at the school and vice president of the Affirmation chapter, met with president John S. K. Kauwe III and Student Life Vice President Jonathan Kau to discuss the experiences of LGBTQ students on campus. This conversation was followed by a social media post by Wilson, which sparked greater conversation about the LGBTQ experience at BYU–Hawaii.
- March – Homosexuality Reframed: Growth Beyond Gay was published by Thomas Pritt, a Latter-day Saint therapist. The book discusses how someone who identifies as gay can move past their current sexual orientation.
- March – Questions from the Closet, a podcast hosted by Ben Schilaty and Charlie Bird, was launched. The podcast addresses common questions about LGBTQ issues in the church. It was later renamed to All Out in the Open in 2024. A Spanish extension of the podcast was started by two BYU students in 2025, titled Un Lugar Más En La Mesa.
- April – On the Record: A Chronology of LGBTQ+ Messaging within the Church of Jesus Christ of Latter-day Saints had its first release by Latter Gay Stories host Kyle Ashworth. The document provides a timeline and sources for the progression of church messaging about LGBTQ people.
- May – BYU Egyptologist John Gee wrote a book titled Saving Faith, where he suggested that victims of sexual abuse “are more likely to become sexual abusers of children” and that “homosexuality is related to childhood sexual abuse.” To draw this conclusion, Gee used data from a book by Jana Riess, who later said that Gee mischaracterized the data. The BYU RSC and Deseret Book removed Gee's book from their catalogs over the controversy. After the book's initial publication, Gee spoke at multiple FAIR conferences where he linked homosexuality with pornography use, stated that "If you don’t believe one church is true, you are much more likely to either be homosexual or bisexual", and quoted Jeffrey R. Holland's "musket fire" speech.
- May – Emmaus LGBTQ Ministry was established as a nonprofit support group for LGBTQ Latter-day Saints. The group was founded by Mormons Building Bridges founder Erika Munson and former Affirmation executive director John Gustav-Wrathall. It was founded as an alternative group to Mormons Building Bridges, due to a difference in priorities.
- June – Dog Valley had its initial showing at the Kanab Film Festival. The documentary recounts the 1988 murder of Gordon Church, a young gay man in Millard County, Utah. It was later released on streaming services.
- June – Tabernacles of Clay by Taylor G. Petrey was published. The book examines LDS Church teachings on sexuality and gender through the lens of gender theory and modern American religion.
- July – Dr. Allen E. Bergin, a former BYU psychology professor and former member of the church's general Sunday School board, offered a public apology for past teachings on same-sex attraction. Among them were suggestions that gay people were sexually promiscuous and that they could overcome their sexual orientation by entering a mixed-orientation marriage. The apology came in response to his being quoted in the On the Record document by Kyle Ashworth 2 months prior.
- July – Same-Sex Attracted, a documentary by LGBTQ BYU students, debuted at the Salt Lake City LGBTQ film festival.
- July – Without the Mask by Charlie Bird was published. The book recounts Bird's coming out as gay after performing as Cosmo the Cougar, the mascot at BYU. While it was originally published by Deseret Book, Charlie requested in 2023 that it be removed from their catalog shortly before he married his husband.
- August – Former bishop Richard Ostler published Listen, Learn, and Love. The book, based on his podcast of the same name, explores ways to better support LGBTQ Latter-day Saints. In 2022, Ostler published a follow-up book titled Listen, Learn, and Love: Improving Latter-day Saint Culture. In 2023, he published a third book titled Listen, Learn, and Love: Building the Good Ship Zion. While all 3 books were published by Cedar Fort, they were sold at Deseret Book for a time. This changed in early 2024 after several orthodox LDS apologists expressed concern over Ostler's books being at Deseret Book; they were removed from the store's catalog afterwards.
- August – Matthew Gong, son of apostle Gerrit W. Gong, was interviewed on the Human Stories podcast about his experience being queer. A month later, he shared his experience leaving the church in an article published by the Salt Lake Tribune.
- October – Skyline Research Institute was formed as a nonprofit, with a website that supports the Family Proclamation and sells scripture-like printouts of the document; they also host the Raising Family Podcast. The nonprofit was founded by Brent Andrewsen (served as board chairman at both Kirton McConkie and the Sutherland Institute) and Carol Rice (worked as a director at American Heritage School and Thanksgiving Point). Among their content are claims (with references to studies) such as: most youth with gender dysphoria will eventually accept their birth gender; LGBT people are more likely be involved in domestic violence; and homosexuality is more common among those who experienced childhood sexual abuse.
- October – The Kim & Terry Turner Encircle home was opened in St. George, Utah.

=== 2021 ===
- January – Shane Carpenter publicly came out as one of the first openly gay missionaries. He was later asked by his mission president to train other missionaries on being inclusive in their teaching. Since then, other missionaries have come out publicly as LGBTQ and shared their experiences.
- February – The Peace Out podcast was started by Sally and Lena Osborne, two Latter-day Saint women who divorced from their husbands, married each other, and left the church. In June, 2022 a series was released for streaming on Hulu titled Mormon No More that told their story.
- February – Craig Call, a grandson of apostle Richard G. Scott, was interviewed on the Latter Gay Stories podcast. He talked about his experience going through a divorce, as well as being bisexual and polyamorous. He also related how Scott gave a general conference address in October 2009 on pornography and told him that the address was directed at him.
- March – Hunter et al v. Department of Education was launched as a class-action lawsuit by LGBTQ students and alumni of various religious schools in the United States. Among them was Ashtin Markowski from BYU, as well as Chandler Horning and Rachel Moulton from BYU-Idaho. The plaintiffs argued that these religious schools had performed discrimination against them and their Title IX protections. The complaints were dismissed in January, 2023 shortly after the federal Respect for Marriage Act was passed. This decision was later upheld in August, 2024 by the Ninth Circuit Court of Appeals.
- March – Students at BYU lit up the Y on Y Mountain with colors of the pride flag to show support for LGBTQ individuals. BYU officials responded that the lighting was not authorized.
- April – Alec Barrow openly talked about being one of the first openly gay seminary teachers in the church. Later in 2022, Clare Dalton shared her experience as one of the first openly lesbian seminary teachers.
- April – BYUtv told Toronto's NOW Magazine that it will start having more openly LGBTQ people in their shows. This came in response to Canadian writers and producers expressing concerns over BYUtv's unwritten exclusion of LGBTQ people.
- April – Natasha Helfer, a Latter-day Saint and licensed sex therapist, was excommunicated by the church for “conduct contrary to the law and order of the church.” Helfer had publicly supported same-sex marriage, counseled that masturbation was not a sin, and insisted that pornography use should not be treated as an addiction.
- April – Austin Haymore, a gay BYU student, was retroactively suspended hours after his graduation. Haymore claimed to have met a man years before who stalked him and reported him to the Honor Code Office for being on a gay dating app.
- April – Hank Smith, a popular speaker and BYU religion professor, referred to gay BYU student Calvin Burke on a Twitter thread as “Korihor” (an anti-Christ in the Book of Mormon). The comment came after an exchange between Smith and others regarding the excommunication of Natasha Helfer, where Burke made comments that were critical of Smith and several far-right DezNat affiliated accounts. Smith eventually removed the post and offered an apology. Months after the exchange, Burke claimed to have been repeatedly harassed by the DezNat community online, to the point of them offering a reward to have Burke expelled from BYU. Burke transferred out of BYU during his senior year due to not feeling safe on campus.
- April – A ward Young Women's president named Liv Haynes spoke at BYU Women's Conference and shared her experience being queer in the church. This was followed in 2023 by Allison Dayton, founder of Lift + Love, speaking at the same conference about ways for parents to love their LGBTQ kids.
- May – As part of the In Re Gray and Rice case, the Utah Supreme Court upheld the right of transgender people to change their name and sex on birth cirtificates and other state records.
- May – The first devotional about the LGBTQ experience on the BYU–Hawaii campus was held, with the Mackintosh family and Iese Wilson as speakers.
- May – Tad R. Callister wrote a Church News article in which he stated that the biggest national problem to date was the breakdown of traditional family values. Part of the article states that same-sex marriage and abortion are tools used by Satan to destroy the nuclear family. Several months later, Callister published America’s Choice: A Nation Under God or Without God, where among other topics, he discusses how gay people's sexual orientation can change.
- May – Queer Mormon Theology was published by Blaire Ostler, a bisexual and intersex Latter-day Saint. The book examines LDS Church doctrine from a queer theological perspective.
- June – Utah governor Spencer Cox signed a declaration designating June 2021 as “LGBTQ+ Pride Month”. June 2022 was also designated as “LGBTQ+ Pride Month”. The governor’s June 2023 declaration was changed to only say “Pride Month”. The 2024 declaration designated June as a “Month of Bridge Building”. No declaration on the subject was made in 2025. In 2026, the governor signed a declaration designating June as “Fidelity Month”.
- June – The BYU RaYnbow Collective was founded by students as a nonprofit to provide community and resources for LGBTQ students.
- June – Singer and American Idol alumnus David Archuleta came out as a member of the LGBTQ community. In his coming out post, Archuleta urged people of faith to "be more understanding and compassionate to those who are LGBTQIA+." Archuleta's coming out brought more attention to the Church's ban on same-sex marriage and relationships. Several months later Archuleta released a video talking about how being LGBTQ and in the church was having an effect on his faith and mental health.
- June – A recurring workshop for LGBTQ people and allies began at the Utah Valley University Institute of Religion. That same year, a similar workshop started at the Utah State University institute. These were the first such classes in the Church Educational System. Later in 2026, another recurring LGBTQ workshop started at the institute near Weber State University.
- June – The first BYU pride march was held in Provo, Utah. The event was organized by BYU Pride, a group that is not sponsored by the university.
- July – The Sit Down with Sky podcast was launched by Skyler Sorensen, first with gay Latter-day Saint Preston Jenkins as co-host, and later with Skyler's wife Amanda. The two were married as a Latter-day Saint couple in a mixed-orientation marriage, with Skyler being gay. The podcast focuses on putting obedience to church teachings above sexual orientation.
- August – Kylen Schulte and Crystal Turner, a recently married same-sex couple, were killed by gunshot in Moab, Utah.
- August – During its annual University Conference, BYU president Kevin J Worthen announced the opening of the Office of Belonging, which was established to provide services for students in racial, sexual, and other minorities.
- August – Latter-day Saint apostle and former university president Jeffrey R. Holland spoke at BYU's annual University Conference, encouraging BYU to use its platform to more aggressively defend the church's positions, especially its position against same-sex marriage. Holland also indirectly targeted 2019 BYU valedictorian Matt Easton for coming out during his convocation speech, saying, "If a student commandeers a graduation podium intended to represent everyone getting diplomas in order to announce his personal sexual orientation, what might another speaker feel free to announce the next year until eventually anything goes?" Holland continued by accusing Easton of "divisiveness." According to Easton's response to Holland's speech in the Salt Lake Tribune, Easton's valedictorian address was pre-approved by the university. Easton later claimed that Elder Holland responded to an email from Easton's father, where he offered an apology to Easton's parents for hurting their feelings, and admonished them to continue being active in the church and paying tithing. 3 years later, Elder Holland acknowledged pain caused to both him and LGBTQ people after his address. He also asserted his love for them, as well as his teaching of doctrine in the address.
- August – Former North Ogden mayor candidate Gregory Smith made a tweet saying “Time to get our muskets” in response to an LGBTQ-related post. The tweet by Smith was making reference to an address given at BYU by apostle Jeffrey R. Holland earlier that month. After pushback, Smith deleted his Twitter account.
- October – An article titled "Understanding and Including Our LGBT Brothers and Sisters" by bishop Ryan J. Wessel was published in the church's official magazine, The Liahona.
- October – The United States Department of Education opened a civil-rights investigation into BYU's disciplining of same-sex dating under the university's Honor Code. The case was later dropped in February, 2022 due to Title IX exceptions.
- October – The church hosted a private tour of the Mesa, Arizona temple for a group of LGBTQ advocates during the temple's open house.
- October – An article titled “Opinion: Latter-day Saint LGBTQ youths may have lower suicide risk, two new studies suggest” was published in the Deseret News. It discusses how two recent studies (one by BYU and one by Bowling Green State University) suggest a negative correlation between being a Latter-day Saint and teen LGBTQ suicide.
- November – In a live Q&A at the University of Virginia, apostle Dallin H. Oaks denied that electroshock conversion therapy happened at BYU while he was president of the university (1971–1980). Several days later, the Salt Lake Tribune published an article citing records that call this statement by Oaks into question.
- November – A staged reading was performed for a musical titled The Rainbow Academy, the Commercial Music capstone project of BYU student Peter Morgan. The musical tells a story about sexual assault in the gay community of a fictional Christian college. After Morgan received his diploma, he offered insight into how BYU administrators tried to censor the performance by moving it off campus and suggesting cuts.
- November – A shooting occurred in a Colorado Springs gay bar where 5 people were killed and 17 were injured. The shooter was an inactive member of the church. The church offered a statement that said they “condemn most especially violent acts that are the result of intolerance against any of God’s children.”
- December – The Called to Queer podcast was launched, hosted by Colette Dalton (a gay Latter-day Saint) and Kate Mower (a nonbinary Latter-day Saint). The podcast features interviews with LGBTQ members of the church.
- December – Businessman Jeff Green publicly announced he was leaving the LDS Church and donating $600,000 to the LGBTQ rights organization Equality Utah. Writing to Russell Nelson, president of the Church, he said: "I believe the Mormon church has hindered global progress in women's rights, civil rights and racial equality, and LGBTQ+ rights."
- December – Deseret Book developed an online course titled “Abandoning Attitudes and Actions of Prejudice” to share ideas on anti-racism. It was hosted by James C. Jones, a black and gay Latter-day Saint who was also co-host of the Beyond the Block podcast. After Jones made a Facebook post that was critical of Jeffrey R. Holland’s August 2021 “musket fire” speech at BYU on LGBTQ issues, Deseret Book took the course down. Jones later put his course up on a different platform.

=== 2022 ===
- January – BYU administrator and Academic Vice President C. Shane Reese told the BYU Speech and Outpatient Campus Clinic to stop speech therapy for transgender clients. After Reese further asserted the decision a month later, ASHA released a public rebuke of the university's decision. Another rebuke was offered by the CAPCSD (Council of Academic Programs in Communication Sciences and Disorders), calling into question the accreditation of BYU's Communication Disorders Department. The Council of Academic Accreditation later informed BYU that they were under formal investigation for discrimination.
- January - The Salt Lake Tribune reported a non-binary BYU graduate did not report being sexually assaulted as a student by their BYU teaching assistant in part because of fear of how the Honor Code office may surveil and distrust non-cisgender students, as well as assault victims.
- February – The church publicly supported a bipartisan LGBTQ non-discrimination bill in Arizona, joining a coalition of faith and community leaders.
- March – The Utah legislature passed a bill banning transgender women athletes from competing in schools. Governor Spencer Cox later vetoed the bill, which was overridden by two thirds of the legislature. This ban was then placed on a temporary hold by a judge after the families of two transgender athletes filed a lawsuit in a Salt Lake City district court. The lawsuit was later dropped in 2025, putting the ban on transgender women athletes into effect.
- March – One year after the Y on Y Mountain was lit in rainbow colors, it was again lit—this time with the colors of the transgender flag. BYU police were present to prevent demonstrations, and the participants remained anonymous.
- March – The Student Association Senate at Rice University voted unanimously to sever athletic ties with Brigham Young University over their mistreatment of LGBTQ students and faculty.
- April – In a General Conference address speaking on the Family Proclamation, apostle Dallin H. Oaks said that “the Lord has required His restored Church to oppose social and legal pressures to retreat from His doctrine of marriage between a man and a woman, to oppose changes that homogenize the differences between men and women or confuse or alter gender… Our Heavenly Father’s plan allows for ‘opposition in all things’, and Satan's most strenuous opposition is directed at whatever is most important to that plan. Consequently, he seeks to oppose progress toward exaltation by distorting marriage, discouraging childbearing, and confusing gender.”
- April – Tender Leaves of Hope: Finding Belonging as LGBTQ Latter-day Saint Women by Meghan Decker was published, reflecting on her experience as a gay woman in the Church. While published by Cedar Fort, the book was sold by Deseret Book for a time.
- April – The Miracle of Forgiveness Art Gala was held in Trolley Square, Salt Lake City. The event came after Latter Gay Stories started the #TrashTheStash movement in 2021 to gather thousands of printed copies of the book, which contained teachings about homosexuality that were later disavowed by the church. At the event, which was hosted again in 2023, local artists showcased pieces created from the gathered books.
- April – Jillian Orr, a gay BYU student, wore a gown with colors of the pride flag lining the inside during a graduation ceremony. Orr was protesting the university’s policies banning same-sex relationships.
- April – The church hosted a private tour of the Washington D.C. temple for a group of LGBTQ advocates from across the United States during the temple's open house.
- May – In a devotional at Ensign College, apostle Dallin H. Oaks and Church Educational System commissioner Clark G. Gilbert spoke about LGBTQ people and the Family Proclamation. President Oaks said “the Church is supporting rights for LGBTQ individuals in housing and health care, while we also preserve our own basic rights of conscience and freedom of religion.” Elder Gilbert said “Let me be clear that individuals or groups who do not treat our LGBTQ members with empathy and charity are not aligned with the teachings of the Church of Jesus Christ. At the same time, ignoring God’s laws has never been the Savior’s pattern for showing love. Remember, Jesus asked us to love God first.”
- June – The church filed an amicus brief in the 303 Creative LLC v. Elenis case, where a Colorado web developer argued she should not be compelled to make a website for a same-sex wedding. The brief stated that LGBTQ rights should not come at the expense of religious freedom, that the First Amendment offers “double protection” for religious speech, and that the government should not compel speech.
- June – Curtis Galke spoke at the North Star conference as one of the first openly gay patriarchs in the church.
- June – Lauren Harrigian was baptized in Mesa, Arizona as one of the first openly transgender members, with preferred pronouns included in official Church records. The baptism was approved by the area's mission president and the First Presidency.
- June – The first official BYU-approved LGBTQ demonstration was held on campus. Organized by the Cougar Pride Center, the demonstration included speeches from students and faculty.
- June – I Spoke to You with Silence: Essays from Queer Mormons of Marginalized Genders was published by the University of Utah Press with Kerry Spencer Prey and Jenn Lee Smith as editors.
- June – This Boy and His Mother by Preston and Cheri Jenkins was published. The book explores their shared experience of navigating life and faith as a gay son and his mother. In the same year, Preston and Taryn Jenkins were married in the temple.
- August – This Body of Water: Surviving Mormonism as a Queer Man was published by Weston Smith, son of Latter-day Saint bishop Evan Smith. The book recounts Weston's story as a gay Latter-day Saint, as well as the pain that came with it.
- August – Maddison Tenney, a student with the BYU RaYnbow Collective, was asked by the Office of Student Life to remove thousands of pamphlets from new student welcome bags. The pamphlets included information on resources for LGBTQ students. Tenney claimed she was told the pamphlets contradicted church teachings. BYU later publicly stated the pamphlets were distributed by an off-campus group and promoted off-campus resources, while the university preferred students to use on-campus services like the Office of Belonging.
- September – Latter-day Saint leaders co-signed a letter published in the Miami Herald asking Florida residents to support LGBTQ non-discrimination legislation.
- September – The BYU RaYnbow Collective held a back to school pride night at a park near the campus, which included a drag show. During the event, volunteers dressed as angels stood between event attendees and a group of protestors.
- September – An academic paper titled “‘A Welding Link of Some Kind’: A Minimalist Theology of Same-Sex Marriage Sealings” was written by Nathan B. Oman, a law professor at William & Mary Law School. The paper discusses the history and development of Latter-day Saint sealings, and how the sealing of same-sex relationships have the potential to fit into that framework.
- October – Apostle Jeffrey R. Holland spoke in General Conference and acknowledged LGBTQ individuals: “I know many who wrestle with wrenching matters of identity, gender, and sexuality. I weep for them, and I weep with them…”
- November – David Archuleta left the church after struggling to reconcile his sexuality with church teachings.
- November – Republican Latter-day Saint Trevor Lee was elected to the Utah House of Representatives. Several months earlier, the Salt Lake Tribune reported that Lee had been running an anonymous DezNat-associated Twitter account that criticized LGBTQ people, as well as Utah governor Spencer Cox for vetoing anti-transgender legislation.
- November – The church publicly endorsed the U.S. Respect for Marriage Act. The law, enacted later that month, ensured government recognition of same-sex marriages. It also ensured that nonprofit religious organizations were not required to perform same-sex marriages under the law. Apostle Dallin H. Oaks publicly explained the church's position several months later saying that the law keeps religious organizations from being forced to perform or celebrate same-sex marriages, protects their tax-exempt status, and protects accreditations of religious schools.
- November – But Jesus: A Conversation by Autumn McAlpin was published. The book reflects on how a gay son changed a Latter-day Saint family's relationship to their faith.
- December – Expanding the Borders of Zion by Charlie Bird was published. The book offers a Latter-day Saint perspective on LGBTQ inclusion and how members can better support queer individuals.
- December – Riley Adamson, a resident in Salt Lake City, designed an LGBTQ version of the Utah state flag.

=== 2023 ===
- January – Brandon Sanderson, a Latter-day Saint and prominent fantasy writer, expressed support for LGBTQ people on a blog post which reads" My current stance is one of unequivocable support for LGBTQ+ rights. I support gay marriage. I support trans rights, the rights of non-binary people, and I support the rights of trans people to affirm their own identity with love and support." Since his statements of support, Sanderson has continued to teach a creative writing class at BYU.
- January – An online course was released on Deseret Book's Seek platform titled "Building Zion: Faithful LGBTQ Allyship with Ben Schilaty". The course discusses loving God and neighbor, sharing, and listening to LGBTQ stories.
- January – The Utah state legislature passed SB16, which introduced a statewide ban on transgender healthcare for minors. This law was later upheld in the 2025 United States v. Skrmetti U.S. Supreme Court case.
- February – An article was published in the Deseret News by Justin Dyer and Michael Goodman (both religion professors at BYU). The article, titled “Perspective: Faith is a factor in good mental health. Why are so many people unable to see this?” discusses how suicidality decreases among both LGBTQ and non-LGBTQ youth when they are religious, based on several studies. A follow-up article with the same conclusions was published in the Deseret News nine months later, authored by Michael Goodman and Ty Mansfield (a gay BYU religion professor).
- February – The Utah State Legislature passed a statewide ban on conversion therapy for minors, codifying into law restrictions that were previously implemented through administrative rules.
- March - TransLucent: How I put off my natural man and discovered a spiritual woman was published by Katherine Herrmann. The book tells Herrmann’s story of fathering 7 children, transitioning to female, and continuing to be active in the church.
- March – Southern Utah University announced Jeffrey R. Holland as its commencement speaker, two years after a controversial speech he gave at BYU in August, 2021 where he talked about LGBTQ issues. His selection led to both protests and support from students. Holland ultimately did not attend due to health issues.
- April – The Cougar Chronicle, a conservative news outlet run by BYU students, wrote a critical article of professor Sarah Coyne, who talked about her 8-year-old child with gender dysphoria in a religion class. Utah Senator Mike Lee later retweeted the article, saying "Commonplace at most universities, but BYU?" This led to online harassment and threats sent to Coyne.
- May – The Gender Harmony Institute was founded in Utah. The nonprofit serves as an alternative to social and medical transitioning for people who experience gender dysphoria. The founders include Jeff Bennion, as well as Chelsea Johnson and David Haralson (both Latter-day Saint marriage and family therapists).
- May – A study done by the Cultural Currents Institute concluded that Utah was the "most closeted" of all U.S. states. The study, which examined Google search queries over 20 years, found that Utah ranked No. 1 for the questions "am I gay", "am I lesbian", and “am I trans”.
- May – During a church devotional for young adults, apostle Dallin H. Oaks read a letter from an anonymous 16-year-old Latter-day Saint girl that said ”I truly don’t understand why so many youth in our church don’t see any problem with people changing their gender every other day, dating people who are the same sex, or identify as no gender. At ward or stake youth activities, I am asked my pronouns, or at school I am asked to dance with a girl who thinks she is a boy. I know we are supposed to love everyone and show them respect, and I always do. I just feel that there is a line being crossed. I wish we heard more talk from church leaders about this problem.”
- May – A Utah mother named April Despain posted a video of pride flags being sent to her family’s home without their permission; she was told they were sent by Murray, Utah PTA president Jennifer Auwerda. This came after Despain started homeschooling her children over concerns of positive LGBTQ messaging in public school and posting complaints about the school district. Throughout June of that year, Despain began posting pictures of a Family Proclamation banner in her yard, and she started selling them to other people. Several weeks later, she was served a temporary civil stalking injunction by Auwerda for sharing pictures and information about Auwerda and school faculty online.
- June – Skyler Sorensen published Exclude Not Thyself: Thriving as a Covenant-Keeping Gay Latter-day Saint, detailing his experience as a gay Latter-day Saint married to a woman.
- June – Richard Mitchell was interviewed on the Latter Gay Stories podcast as one of the first former bishops in the church to openly discuss marrying a man.
- June – The church released an updated version of Preach my Gospel, removing the previous baptismal interview question asking if the applicant has participated in any "homosexual transgressions."
- June – The Collin Russell Encircle home was opened in Heber, Utah.
- July – Ballet West music director Jared Oaks, grandson of Dallin H. Oaks, discussed his experience being gay on the Human Stories podcast, including how it affected his relationship with his family.
- August – Active Latter-day Saints Charlie Bird and Ryan Clifford married in a same-sex ceremony at the Utah state capitol. Their celebration included the appearance of BYU's mascot Cosmo the Cougar, which drew criticism from some students.
- August – An explicit prohibition on “same-sex romantic behavior” was re-introduced to the BYU Honor Code, after it had previously been removed in February, 2020.
- September – The first Gather Conference for LGBTQ Latter-day Saints, hosted by the Lift + Love Foundation, was held in Provo, Utah. The annual Gather Arizona Conference began in 2024, and the first Gather Southeast Conference was held in 2024.
- October – In General Conference, President Russell M. Nelson gave an address titled “Think Celestial!” In the address, he said “Physical intimacy is only for a man and a woman who are married to each other.”
- December – Two years after his death, the children of D. Michael Quinn published Chosen Path: A Memoir. The book relates experiences in Quinn's life as a BYU professor and historian, as well as one of the September Six and a gay man in a mixed-orientation marriage.

=== 2024 ===
- January – Aaron Sherinian was named as the new managing director for Church Communication. Sherinian's hiring received criticism from orthodox Latter-day Saints due to his public support of same-sex marriage. In 2025 at the annual FAIR conference, Sherinian was asked a question about criticism he has received that has called into question his support of the Family Proclamation. His response drew more criticism for not being explicit enough in supporting the Proclamation.
- January – The Mormon Stories channel released a podcast titled “A New Norm? Married Gay Mormons Get Callings & The Sacrament”. It covered the marriage of Charlie Bird and Ryan Clifford, as well as the lack of immediate church disciplinary action taken against them. Afterwards, a joint statement was made by Equality Utah, Equality Arizona, and Wyoming Equality condemning the coverage of the story as a breach of privacy. The podcast host John Dehlin later offered a public apology in response. The Mascot by Leicester Productions was later released in 2025 as a short documentary relating Charlie's story and current position in the church; he was not involved in its production.
- January – The church hosted a private tour of the Red Cliffs Utah Temple for a group of LGBTQ members and advocates during the temple's open house. This tour received online criticism in some orthodox LDS circles.
- February – Jubilee hosted a Middle Ground conversation between Mormons and Ex-Mormons with various high-profile people such as John Dehlin and hosts of the Ward Radio YouTube channel. One of the conversation topics was “The Mormon community welcomes the LGBTQ+ community”. This included discussions on perceptions of equality between straight and LGBTQ members, whether or not being gay is a “trial”, whether LGBTQ people attain salvation, and LGBTQ mental health in the church.
- March – David Archuleta released a song titled Hell Together. The song was inspired by Archuleta's mother, who left the church with him in 2022 due to the church's LGBTQ policies. Archuleta and the song received responses from various Latter-day Saint apologists.
- March – The documentary A Long Way from Heaven, produced by LGBTQ students at BYU, premiered, chronicling LGBTQ experiences at the university and the lighting of Y Mountain.
- April - Gregory F. Peterson was named as president of Salt Lake Community College, making him one of the first openly gay college presidents in Utah. He's been interviewed about being in a same-sex marriage and an active Latter-day Saint.
- May – Kerry Spencer Pray published The Book of Queer Mormon Joy, a collection of essays from LGBTQ Latter-day Saints.
- July – The Book of the Lavens was published by Evan Sharley, a transgender woman and former Latter-day Saint who is a leader in the Reform Mormonism movement. This was one of the first books of scripture in the larger Mormon tradition that was produced by an openly LGBTQ person.
- August – The church updated its general handbook with stricter policies for transgender members, including restrictions on gender record-keeping, restroom use, and callings involving children and youth. This was later followed in 2026 by a handbook change that invalidated any temple ordinance not performed according to someone’s assigned sex at birth.
- September – Steven E. Snow, an emeritus general authority and church historian, was interviewed by the Salt Lake Tribune. Snow discussed how having gay grandchildren changed his perspective to be more inclusive towards LGBTQ people in the church. Later in 2025, he attended the Lift + Love Gather Conference and offered a prayer.
- October – Queering Kinship in the Mormon Cosmos was published by Taylor G. Petrey. The book discusses traditional and more contemporary teachings on LGBTQ questions and possible interpretations.
- October – Jared Oaks, a gay grandson of apostle Dallin H. Oaks, composed an orchestral piece in memory of Matthew Shepard, a gay University of Wyoming student who was killed in 1998. The piece, titled Bleeding, is meant to illustrate the impact of laws and policies that result in violence.
- November – Nathan Kitchen, former president of Affirmation, published The Boughs of Love: Navigating the Queer Latter-day Saint Experience During an Ongoing Restoration, exploring the LGBTQ experience in the church.
- November – During the 2024 United States presidential election, it was estimated that about 64% of Latter-day Saint votes were for Donald Trump. It was also estimated that the Trump campaign and other Republican groups spent tens of millions of dollars on anti-transgender ads.
- November – Laurie Lee Hall, a former Latter-day Saint stake president, and temple architect, published Dictates of Conscience: From Mormon High Priest to My New Life as a Woman, detailing her experience of socially transitioning in the church.

=== 2025 ===
- January – The Salt Lake Tribune reported on alleged hiring practices at BYU under Church Educational System commissioner Clark G. Gilbert, which some claimed targeted LGBTQ-supportive faculty. All sources employed by BYU remained anonymous. Shortly afterwards, Ben Schilaty published a blog article titled "I Worked at BYU as an Openly Gay Administrator", where he talked about leaving BYU because of the change in culture, interactions with other administrators, and his choice to become a professor at Utah Valley University.
- February – The Pew Research Center released their 2023-2024 Religious Landscape study. The same study from 2014 said that 36% of Latter-day Saint respondents agree homosexuality should be accepted by society, while 46% said the same in this survey. In September 2026, a more detailed report from Pew on Latter-day Saints was released with more insights. While 26% of Latter-day Saints respondents favored or strongly favored legal same-sex marriage in 2014, 41% did so in this survey. The survey also found that 24% of former Latter-day Saints identified as LGB.
- March – Organizers of the Sundance Film Festival announced that they would be relocating the festival to Colorado as of 2027. This came shortly before the passing of Utah House Bill 77, which banned LGBTQ flags, among other flags, from being displayed in government buildings and schools. Many believed that the bill factored into the festival's decision to relocate.
- March – With the passing of Utah's House Bill 77, Utah became the first U.S. state to ban LGBTQ flags, among other flags, from being displayed in schools and government buildings. Several weeks later in response to the ban, the Salt Lake City Council approved a series of LGBTQ and Juneteenth flags for the city.
- May – A change to Utah's Health and Human Services Code went into effect, which allows individuals 15 and older to petition for a change of gender marker in a birth certificate. If granted, this could also be followed by changes to gender markers on driver's licenses, passports, and social security cards. Another Utah law went into effect which required incarcerated persons to be housed in accordance with their sex assigned at birth. It also banned puberty blockers and transgender hormonal treatment for inmates. Also, a law went into effect which states that a parent's approval/disapproval of their child's sexual orientation may not be the basis for removal of the child from the parent's custody, or be a determining factor when a court is determining child custody as part of a divorce or other family law proceeding.
- May – A petition was filed to recall Republican Councilwoman Julie Spilsbury, a Latter-day Saint in Mesa, Arizona. The opposition came in response to Spilsbury's support of transgender rights and endorsement of Kamala Harris instead of Donald Trump in the 2024 presidential election. Spilsbury was interviewed about her efforts on the All Out in the Open podcast.
- June – The Mildred Berryman Institute for LGBTIQ2S+ Utah History was organized as a nonprofit. The group has held events and written historical content on LGBTQ people in Utah.
- June – A Utah law went into effect that requires students in public college and university dorms to be housed based on their biological sex at birth.
- June – An academic paper titled “Shadow Faith or Organizational Breakoff? Inflection Points and the Symbolic Convergence of Latter-day Saint Subculture” was published by Brent Yergensen, an associate professor at the University of Texas at Tyler. The paper discusses the possible emergence of an alternative faith in the church that prioritizes LGBTQ equality. The paper claims that the “shadow faith” comes in the form of online influencers such as Richard Ostler and Ben Schilaty, as well as organizations like the Gather Conference hosted by Lift + Love.
- June – In the Chiles v. Salazar U.S. Supreme Court case, the church joined other religious organizations in filing an amicus brief that opposed Colorado’s current definition of conversion therapy and asserted that talk therapy on gender and sexual orientation for minors is protected speech under the First Amendment, even if it doesn’t affirm an LGBTQ identity. The same case included another amicus brief from Clifford Rosky and Lisa Diamond, both professors at the University of Utah, who argued that the Alliance Defending Freedom mischaracterized their research on fluid sexuality by using it as evidence that conversion therapy to change sexual orientation can be effective, even though that same research also described such efforts as harmful and ineffective. Later in 2026, the case was ruled in favor of talk therapy not counting as “conversion therapy”.
- August – An Inconvenient Faith was released as a docuseries that explores complex topics in LDS faith and beliefs. Two episodes were devoted to the experience of LGBTQ Latter-day Saints.
- September – Tabernacle Choir singer and North Star presenter Alex Lindstrom wrote an article in the Liahona titled “Seeing Myself in the Family Proclamation”, which was only included in the United States and Canada section of the issue. Lindstrom discussed his experience with same-sex attraction and his decision to follow church teachings.
- September – The Young Encircle home was opened in Ogden, Utah.
- September – As part of a wave of anti-LGBTQ messaging following the assassination of Charlie Kirk at Utah Valley University, Latter-day Saint Utah legislator Trevor Lee filed a bill to rename Harvey Milk Blvd in Salt Lake City to Charlie Kirk Blvd. Several weeks later, a mural of Harvey Milk on the same street was splattered with red paint. Lee's defense for naming a street outside his district included the claim that Harvey Milk was a "pedophile". The bill never received a hearing.
- September – In the U.S. Supreme Court cases Little v. Hecox and West Virginia v. B. P. J., the church joined other religious organizations in filing an amicus brief supporting bans on transgender women competing in women's sports in Idaho and West Virginia. They asserted that granting equal protection to transgender people would undermine religious freedom and lead to the “stigmatizing and isolating” of religious communities.
- September – A 2-day conference was held at BYU to celebrate the 30th anniversary of the Family Proclamation. Apostle Ronald A. Rasband gave a speech during the conference where he said that the Proclamation was "doctrine" and a "revelatory voice". Clark G. Gilbert also gave a talk on the Proclamation at BYU-Idaho that same day. 2 weeks later, Elder Rasband repeated many of the same teachings in General Conference.
- October – The Associated Press published an article on Dallin H. Oaks shortly before he was ordained as prophet. Among other things, the article discusses President Oaks’ teachings and actions towards LGBTQ members.
- October – Sanctuary premiered at the SoHo Film Festival. Named after an art installation created by Salt Lake City architect Doug Staker, the film explores difficult experiences of LGBTQ people in faith communities. It was produced by Latter-day Saints Autumn McAlpin and Vienna Boyes.
- October – A Deseret Book ad included a children's book titled Princess in Black and the Prince in Pink by Shannon Hale. This was followed by numerous Latter-day Saints online expressing concern over the book for its depiction of “a boy prancing around in pink with a tiara”, calling it “garbage” and “a blatant attack on God’s clear design for gender and family”. The book was removed from their online catalog shortly after these online posts.
- November – Shortly after the calling of Gérald Caussé as an apostle, he was interviewed by Peggy Fletcher Stack of the Salt Lake Tribune. One of the questions asked was “Do you anticipate a time when same-sex married Latter-day Saints could go to church together?” Elder Caussé responded by saying that church doctrine as taught by church leaders is clear on the subject.
- November – The first season of Surviving Mormonism with Heather Gay was released by Bravo. Hosted by Heather Gay of The Real Housewives of Salt Lake City, the series includes interviews on sexual abuse in LDS culture, gay conversion therapy, and the discontinued Evergreen conference.

=== 2026 ===
- January – The Canada Area Presidency released a statement expressing opposition to Bill C-9 introduced in the Canadian House of Commons, requesting that a more explicit protection of “good faith” religious speech and practice be included. The Bill sought to clarify the Criminal Code's "hate propaganda, hate crime and access to religious or cultural places" section and further prevent discrimination of different groups such as those based on sex, sexual orientation, and gender identity/expression.
- January – Learning the Great Fundamentals was published by Dallin H. Oaks through Deseret Book. One section of the book states that "Outside the bonds of marriage between a man and a woman, all uses of our procreative powers are to one degree or another sinful and contrary to God’s plan for the exaltation of His children."
- February – We’re Thankful for the Moisture was published by Eli McCann, a humor columnist for the Salt Lake Tribune. The book includes essays on Eli growing up gay and serving in the church, resigning his church membership, marrying his husband, and becoming a father.
- February – Shortly after Clark G. Gilbert was called as an apostle, he was interviewed by Peggy Fletcher Stack of the Salt Lake Tribune. One of the questions asked was “Do you think members who support same-sex marriage or who disagree with parts of the Family Proclamation should get a [temple] recommend?” Elder Gilbert’s response focused on balancing God’s laws and love. He also quoted Jeffrey R. Holland’s 2021 “musket fire” BYU speech and said “Christ never once said ‘because I love you, you are free to choose which commandments to keep.’” Gilbert used the same quote from Holland in a subsequent interview with the Deseret News, and in both 2026 sessions of General Conference.
- February – David Archuleta published Devout: Losing my Faith to Find Myself as a memoir of his growing up, performing, experiencing religious scrupulosity, and coming out as gay in the church. He also recounts interactions he had with apostle M. Russell Ballard and how it affected his faith. The book was inspired by Jennette McCurdy’s memoir I'm Glad My Mom Died.
- April – Stay in the Room was published by Jeff McLean, Michael McLean, and Brad Reedy. In the book, Jeff (Michael's son) tells his experience being a gay Latter-day Saint who left the church, along with Michael’s experience being a Latter-day Saint performer with a gay son.
- April – Charlie Bird and Ryan Clifford announced their plans to have a child through IVF and surrogacy. This was one of the first instances of an openly married gay couple sharing their parenting experience within the church. Several months later, Charlie announced that he and his husband had received death threats stemming from content that was critical of their decision to have a child, and that he would be sharing less about their experience on social media.
- June – A Utah family sued Nebo School District over failing to respond to reports of repeated physical and emotional bullying of their daughter at Payson Junior High, who was targeted for being LGBTQ. The bullying, which took place over a period of 3 school years, led to the daughter being taken out of the school.
- June – At a seminar for new mission leaders, Dallin H. Oaks taught that “There are many political, legal and social pressures for changes that would change the definition of marriage or de-emphasize its importance, confuse gender, or homogenize the differences between men and women that are essential for us to accomplish God’s great Plan of Happiness. Our eternal perspective sets us against such changes. We believe that we must contend for the kind of families that provide the best conditions for the development and happiness of children—all of God’s children.”
- June – In his Undivided series on religion in the United States, Simran Jeet Singh hosted a series of interviews on LGBTQ belonging in the church, including with advocates like Ben Schilaty and Kate Mower.
- June – Official church social media pages featured an article by a gay member named Pono Skousen, who talked about being a fashion designer; no mention of his sexual oritentation was made. Pono is also the co-founder of the Church of Martin fashion brand, which mixes gay and Latter-day Saint culture. The post and the church’s social media team received criticism from orthodox members for holding up an openly gay member with a boyfriend, and for not emphasizing traditional masculinity. Some time later, the post was removed from the church’s pages.
- August – After Jeopardy! host and Latter-day Saint Ken Jennings mentioned on Bluesky that he subscribed to the New York Times, several commenters interpreted that as him supporting an anti-transgender organization. Afterwards, Jennings expressed support for transgender people, stating “I don’t think there’s any issue today I care about on a personal level more deeply than trans rights. And it’s rough out there right now. Bigots on one side of the political aisle and too many cowards on the other.”
- September – A Sacred Journey: A Guidebook for Latter-day Saint Parents of Gender-Diverse Children was published by Julia Campbell Bernards, a marriage and family therapist.
- September – Off Ramp: How to Be a Peacemaker in an Age of Contempt was published by Utah governor Spencer Cox. A portion of the book discussed the 2015 Utah Compromise, which further banned LGBTQ discrimination in the state while including religious exemptions. Cox described this as a win-win situation for both sides. He also discussed the 2023 statewide ban on gender-affirming care for minors, describing it as a zero-sum game. During his book tour, Cox went on the Daily Show with Jon Stewart, during which Stewart brought up the Utah Compromise, the power disparity between Utah’s LGBTQ and Christian communities, and Cox’s 2026 declaration of Fidelity Month in June.
- September – Dallin H. Oaks gave a speech on the United States Constitution at the National Cathedral. While speaking on the 2015 Utah Compromise, he cited gay activist Troy Williams, director of Equality Utah—one of the first times a church president has approvingly cited an LGBTQ activist. While the compromise was created to help solve problems of discrimination against LGBTQ people, Oaks never explicitly mentioned LGBTQ people during the speech.
- October – Patrick Brady was interviewed on Mormon Stories as one of the first former bishops in the church to publicly talk about being in a same-sex relationship while serving as a bishop.

== See also ==
- Homosexuality and the LDS Church
- Law of adoption (Mormonism)
- LGBTQ rights and the LDS Church
- LGBTQ rights in Utah
- LGBTQ Mormon suicides
- List of Christian denominational positions on homosexuality
- Mormonism in the 21st century
- Sexuality and Mormonism
- Utah Constitutional Amendment 3
