= Bruce Bastian =

American computer scientist (1948–2024)

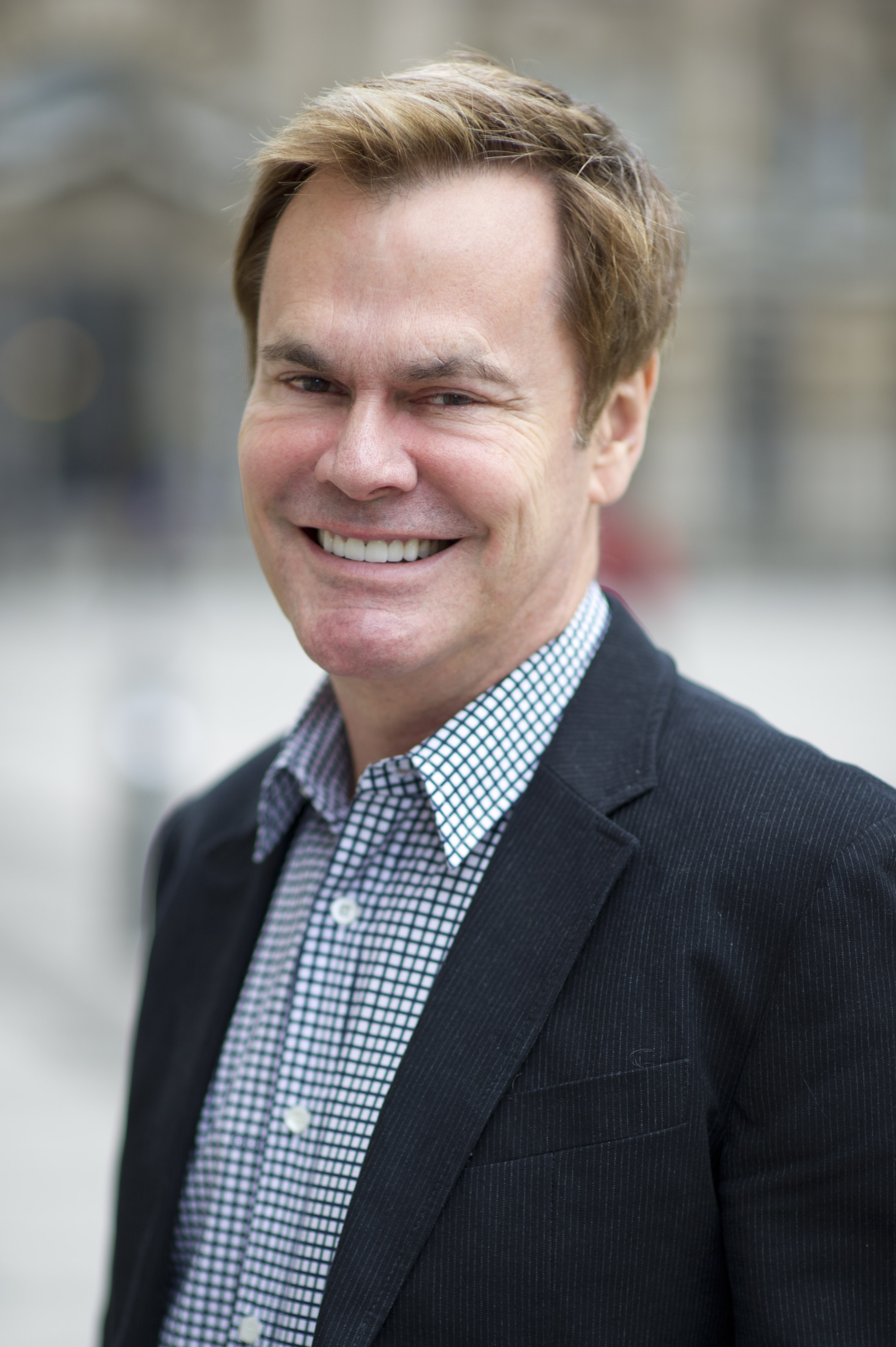
- Bastian in 2011
- Born: Bruce Wayne Bastian; March 23, 1948; Twin Falls, Idaho, U.S.
- Died: June 16, 2024 (aged 76); Palm Springs, California, U.S.
- Education: Brigham Young University
- Occupations: Computer programmer; businessperson
- Known for: Co-founding WordPerfect
- Spouse(s): Melanie Laycock (m. 1976; div. 1993) Clint Ford (m. 2018)
- Children: 4

Bruce Wayne Bastian (March 23, 1948 – June 16, 2024) was an American computer programmer, businessperson, and philanthropist. He co-founded WordPerfect (originally known as Satellite Software International) with Alan Ashton in 1978.

== Early life and education ==
Bastian was born on March 23, 1948, in Twin Falls, Idaho. He was raised as a member of The Church of Jesus Christ of Latter-day Saints, and he was a missionary in Italy. He earned a Bachelor of Arts in Music and a Master's degree in Computer Science from Brigham Young University (BYU) in Provo, Utah. As an undergraduate, he served as the director of the BYU Cougar Marching Band and developed a software program to help choreograph marching band performances together with Alan Ashton.

== Career ==
Bastian began working for the Eyring Research Institute (ERI) at BYU, and he was soon joined by Ashton to work on a word processor for the city of Orem, Utah. The two worked on a Data General computer. Their collaborative work later became the company known as WordPerfect, founded in 1979. In 1982, they released WordPerfect 2.2 for the IBM Personal Computer. Bastian was the chairman of the board until 1994. When Novell bought WordPerfect Corp. in 1994, Ashton and Bastian each received almost $700 million in Novell stock.

== Philanthropy ==
Bastian established the B.W. Bastian Foundation in 1997.

A philanthropist, Bastian supported the LGBT community and the performing arts in Utah. He was a donor to Encircle, the Utah Pride Center, and Equality Utah, whose executive director noted, "No individual has had a greater impact on the lives of LGBTQ Utahns." In 2003, he donated more than $1 million to the Human Rights Campaign. He served on their board for the next 22 years.

Bastian also provided financial assistance to the Plan-B Theatre Company, the Utah Symphony and Utah Opera, and Ballet West. At the University of Utah, he donated $1.7 million for the renovation of Kingsbury Hall in 1997 and $1.3 million for the purchase of 55 Steinway pianos in 2000. He also supported the LGBT Resource Center on campus.

In 2010, President Barack Obama appointed Bastian to the Presidential Advisory Committee of the Arts in honor of Bastian's long-term commitment to the arts.

== Personal life and death ==
Bastian married Melanie Laycock in 1976, and they had four sons; they divorced in 1993. He later married Clint Ford. They resided in Orem, Utah and Palm Springs, California. Bastian died from lung disease on June 16, 2024, at the age of 76.
