= Utah House Bill 11 =

2022 law in U.S. state

Utah Legislature
- Territorial extent: Utah
- Enacted by: Utah House of Representatives
- Enacted by: Utah Senate
- Vetoed by: Spencer Cox
- Vetoed: March 15, 2022
- Veto overridden: March 25, 2022
- Abrogated: August 19, 2022

Legislative history

Initiating chamber: Utah House of Representatives
- Introduced: December 13, 2021
- First reading: January 18, 2022
- Second reading: February 14, 2022
- Third reading: February 16, 2022

Revising chamber: Utah Senate
- Received from the Utah House of Representatives: February 17, 2022
- First reading: February 17, 2022
- Second reading: March 3, 2022
- Third reading: March 4, 2022

Final stages
- Reconsidered by the Utah House of Representatives after veto: March 25, 2022
- Reconsidered by the Utah Senate after veto: March 25, 2022
- Status: Blocked

Utah House Bill 11 (HB 11) is a 2022 law in the state of Utah that prohibits transgender girls from competing in women's school sports. It was vetoed by Governor Spencer Cox on March 15, 2022, but was overridden on March 25, 2022. It was blocked by a temporary injunction from the Third District Court of Utah on August 19, 2022, preventing the enforcement of House Bill 11. As of June 2025, the lawsuit is still pending a final decision. Only four transgender children are known to have been playing in sports in Utah at the time House Bill 11 passed.

== Provisions ==
House Bill 11 generally prohibits transgender girls from competing in girls' sports. More specifically, it restricts access for anyone grades K–12. If a student's gender marker does not align with the sport they wish to compete in, a commission would be organized to determine eligibility, mostly based on physical characteristics.

== Reactions ==
=== Opposition ===
Multiple protests were organized in opposition to House Bill 11. A major protest was held outside of the Utah State Capitol on February 25, 2022, the day Cox's veto was overridden. Over a thousand students walked out on April 6.

Spencer Cox, the Governor of Utah at the time of passage of House Bill 11, opposed the bill and promised to veto it. He stated that he did not support a total ban on transgender athletes. He also stated that were "several fundamental flaws" with the bill. Cox would later go on to say part of his motivation to veto House Bill 11 was due to high transgender suicide rates.

== See also ==
- LGBTQ rights in Utah
