= Alan C. Ashton =

American computer scientist

Alan Ashton
- Born: May 7, 1942 (age 84); Salt Lake City, Utah, U.S.
- Education: University of Utah
- Known for: WordPerfect
- Spouse: Karen Jackman Ashton
- Children: 11
- Scientific career
- Fields: Computer science bioinformatics
- Workplaces: WordPerfect Corporation; Novell

Alan C. Ashton (born May 7, 1942) is an American computer scientist. He is the co-founder of WordPerfect Corporation and a former professor at Brigham Young University (BYU). Ashton worked for a time with Novell after the company bought WordPerfect, and subsequently founded Thanksgiving Point in Lehi, Utah.

== Career ==
Born in Salt Lake City, Utah, Ashton began his work in computer science at the University of Utah, studying computing and music in the early 1970s. In 1977, Ashton began work on word processing when he created a specification for an improved console-based word processor. His specifications outlined various innovations at the time, including continuous documents, function key shortcuts, modeless editing, and primitive WYSIWYG formatting. Ashton and his student Bruce Bastian incorporated Satellite Software International in September 1979, which later became the WordPerfect Corporation. In 1987, Ashton left BYU to serve full-time as president and chief executive officer of WordPerfect Corporation.

Ashton, Bastian, and W. E. "Pete" Peterson ran WordPerfect as a triumvirate; Ashton and Bastian each controlled 49.5% of the company, and Peterson controlled 1%. While Ashton was the titular head of WordPerfect, Peterson ran the day-to-day operations, and was frequently misinterpreted as the head of the company by the press. Ashton's management style was hands-off. For a time, the entire development organization of WordPerfect reported directly to him.

In 1990, Ashton was identified by Forbes magazine as one of the 400 wealthiest individuals in the United States.

When Novell bought WordPerfect Corp. in 1994, Ashton and Bastian each received almost $700 million in Novell stock. Ashton joined the Novell Corporation's Board of Directors in 1994, and resigned in 1996.

Ashton is unrelated to Ashton-Tate, a database company that was a contemporary of WordPerfect in the 1980s.

In April 1999, Ashton founded ASH Capital, a venture investment company controlled by Ashton and managed by James Savas and David Harkness.

== Thanksgiving Point ==
After WordPerfect was acquired by Novell and Ashton's responsibilities were alleviated, he and his wife founded Thanksgiving Point in Lehi, Utah, within 20 miles of WordPerfect's former corporate headquarters in Orem.

"We wanted to create something for the people around us," says Ashton. "We've been blessed financially and with a large family. We wanted to give something back to the community and the families in our area."

Today, Thanksgiving Point provides the community with a place where adults and children can learn about farming, gardening and cooking. It also has a championship caliber golf course, a museum of ancient life, a children's curiosity museum, a 55-acre themed garden, and a movie theater.

== Personal life ==
Ashton is a member of the Church of Jesus Christ of Latter-day Saints (LDS Church) and a grandson of former church president David O. McKay. He served as a missionary in central Germany as a young man. Ashton later married Karen Jackman Ashton; they are the parents of 11 children. He has served in the LDS Church as a bishop, stake president, and as president of the Canada Toronto West Mission from 2004 to 2007. From 2013 to 2016, Ashton and his wife served as the president and matron of the Provo Utah Temple.

=== California Proposition 8 ===
The California Proposition 8 campaign announced that a $1 million donation to support Proposition 8 was given by Ashton. The donation was reported by the Proposition 8 campaign on October 28, 2008. Ashton's former business partner Bastian gave $1 million to oppose Proposition 8.
