= Utah SB 296 (2015) =

Utah Senate Bill 296 is a law passed by the Utah State Legislature and signed into law by Governor Gary Herbert in 2015. SB 296 amended the 1997 Utah Antidiscrimination Act to add sexual orientation and gender identity as protected classes under state law when it comes to housing and employment. The law was described by various news outlets and commentators as the "Utah Compromise".

== Legislative history ==
On March 6, 2015, the Utah State Senate passed, in a 23–5 vote, statewide legislation to ban discrimination based on sexual orientation and gender identity in employment and housing (public accommodation not included) with exemptions for religious organizations and their affiliates such as schools and hospitals, as well as the Boy Scouts. The bill also would protect employees from being fired for talking about religious or moral beliefs, as long as the speech was reasonable and not harassing or disruptive. It was approved by the state House on March 11, in a 65–10 vote. On March 12, 2015, Governor Gary Herbert signed the bill into law.

== Opinion ==
The measure was backed by the Church of Jesus Christ of Latter-day Saints. Equality Utah, Human Rights Campaign and ACLU of Utah also supported the legislation as a step forward for LGBT people in Utah. However, the ACLU of Utah and the Center for American Progress (via its blog ThinkProgress) voiced criticism of the idea that the broad religious exemptions for discrimination contained in SB 296 could serve as a model for nondiscrimination law in other states, as Utah has long had religious exemptions for all state civil rights laws in ways that other states have not.

== See also ==
- LGBT rights in Utah
- Senate Bill 297 (2015 General Session of the 61st Utah State Legislature)
- Equality Act (United States)
- Employment Non-Discrimination Act
- Fairness for All Act
