= Thanksgiving Point =

Farm, garden, and museum complex in Lehi, Utah, United States

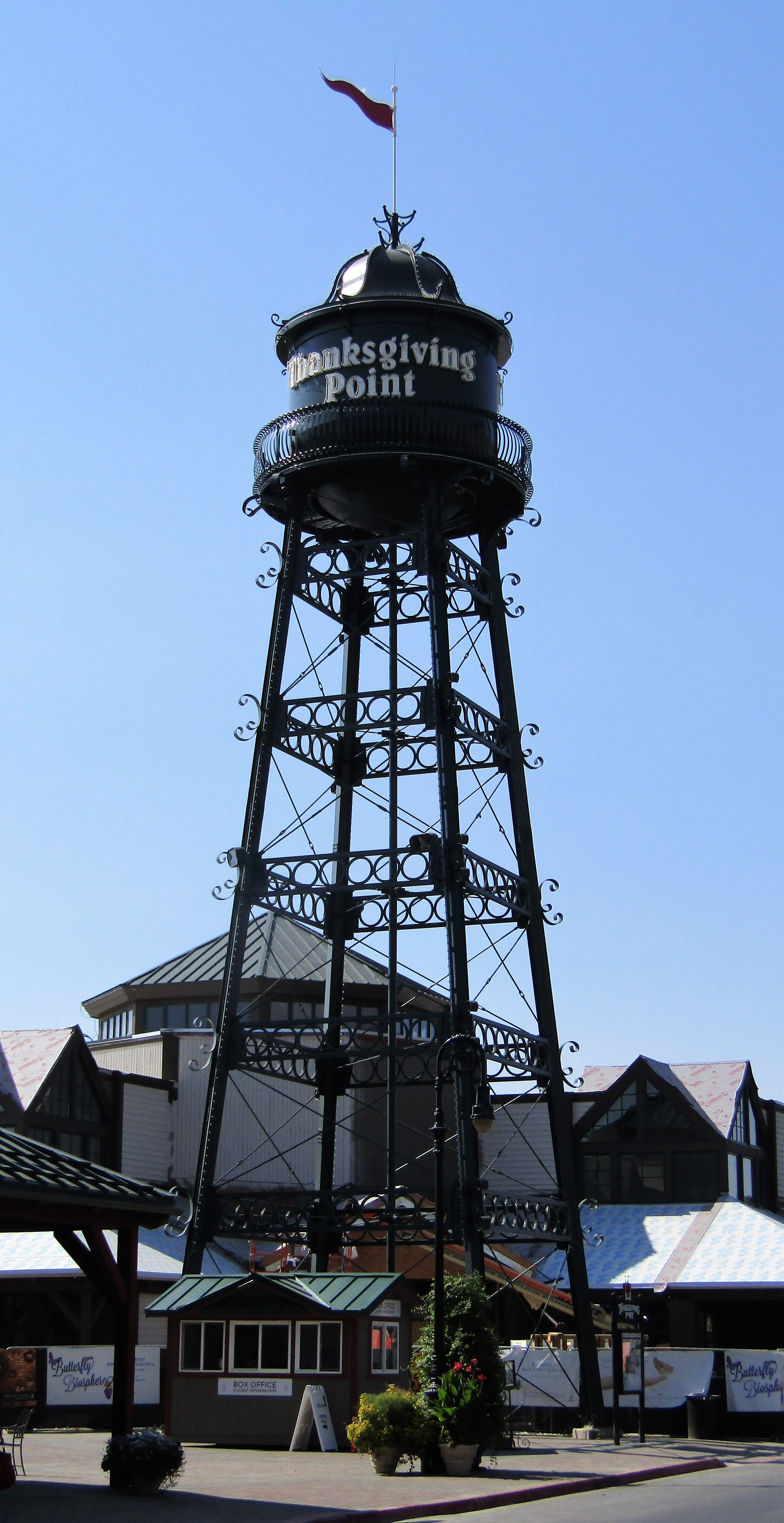
- View of the Thanksgiving Point tower
- Established: 1995
- Location: Thanksgiving Point; 3003 N. Thanksgiving Way; Lehi, Utah; Utah, United States
- Coordinates: 40.4313°N 111.9026°W
- Visitors: Average of 2.8 million each year
- Director: McKay Christensen
- Website: thanksgivingpoint.org

Thanksgiving Point is a 501(c)(3) non-profit indoor and outdoor farm, garden, and museum complex in Lehi, Utah, United States. Its five main attractions include Ashton Gardens, Butterfly Biosphere, Farm Country, Museum of Ancient Life, and Museum of Natural Curiosity. It also operates multiple dining options, event spaces, and gift shops. Each year, approximately 2.8 million guests visit Thanksgiving Point.

Other businesses under separate management but located on Thanksgiving Point's campuses include Brick Canvas Studios, Holdman Studios and Glass Art Institute, Larry H. Miller Megaplex Theatres, and Thanksgiving Point Golf Course.

Thanksgiving Point also serves as an extension location of Utah State University.

== History ==
Thanksgiving Point was founded in 1995 by Karen Jackman Ashton and Alan C. Ashton. Ashton co-founded the software company WordPerfect with Bruce Bastian in Provo, Utah in 1979. In 1994, WordPerfect was sold to Utah-based Novell for nearly a billion dollars. After the sale, Alan purchased farmland in Lehi, Utah and gifted it to his wife Karen as a Valentine's Day gift on February 14, 1995. They planned to build a community garden and farm experience. The name for the project, Thanksgiving Point, was chosen to express gratitude. Thanksgiving Point Institute registered as a 501(c)(3) organization in 1997.

The first venue to open to the public in 1996 was Farm Country. Farm Country's exhibits demonstrate the origins of the food supply in a working farm environment.

In 1997, Thanksgiving Gardens (renamed Ashton Gardens in 2016) partially opened to the public for its first season. In 2000, the gardens fully opened as a flagship 55-acre experience dedicated to offering the community a reflective and peaceful place.

In 2000, the Museum of Ancient Life opened with a travel-through-time dinosaur walk through a 30,000-square-foot venue.

The 45,000-square-foot Museum of Natural Curiosity opened in 2014. The family science museum offers four indoor galleries and a 3-acre garden gallery.

In 2019, Butterfly Biosphere opened as Utah's first insectarium. A 10,000 square foot USDA certified conservatory has a path through hundreds of exotic butterflies from around the world.

== Ashton Gardens ==
The gardens opened to the public in 1997 as Thanksgiving Gardens. The master plan was developed with Salt Lake City landscape architect Leonard Grassli. The gardens cover approximately 55 acres and include 15 different themed gardens, including a replica of the garden described in Frances Hodgson Burnett's book The Secret Garden. Other themed garden rooms include a Monet pond, Rocky Mountain landscapes, and a rose garden growing 60 different varieties.

At the opening of the 2016 season, Thanksgiving Point renamed the gardens "Ashton Gardens" in honor of the contributions of Alan and Karen Ashton and the Ashton Family Foundation.

Community horticulture courses are offered by Utah State University master gardener volunteers. Commonly offered courses include square foot gardening and perennial plant landscape design. Some gardens demonstrate water-wise gardening techniques and the irrigation and water features work as a vast water reclamation system.

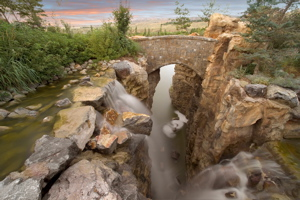
Bridge at the Waterfall Amphitheatre

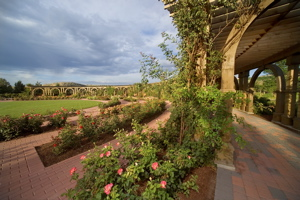
Trellises in the Rose Garden

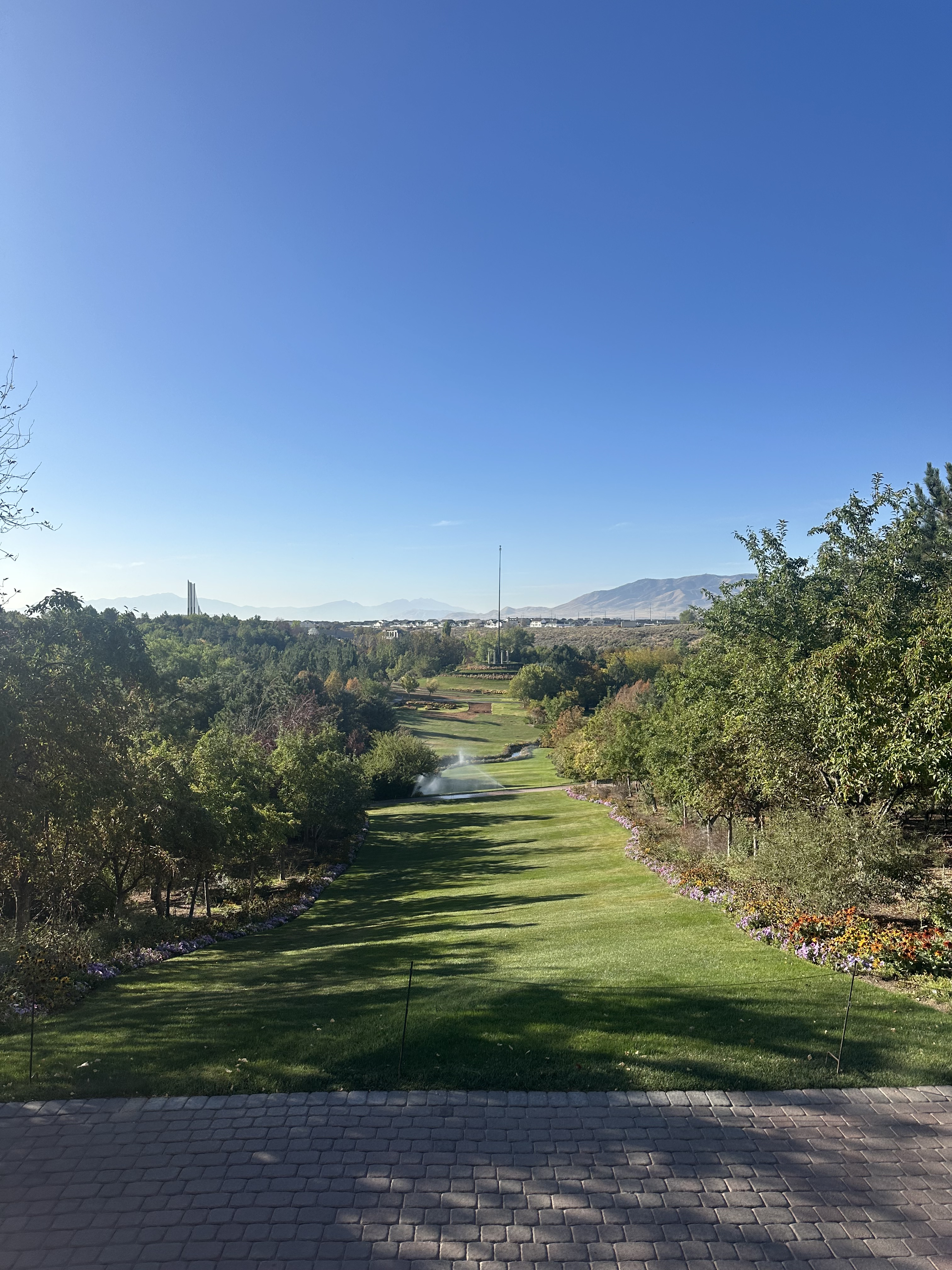
Overlooking the Ashton Gardens

=== Light of the World Garden ===
Light of the World Garden is a 2.5 acres (1.0 ha) garden located in Ashton Gardens created and donated by bronze sculpture artist Angela Johnson. It features 35 monument-size sculptures from the Biblical New Testament account of the life of Jesus.

== Butterfly Biosphere ==
The Butterfly Biosphere is home to hundreds of species of animals, including 20 species of tarantulas, fist-sized beetles, and hundreds of butterflies from around the world. Species on exhibit include species like Blue Morpho, Atlas Moth, Black Widow Spider, and Goliath Beetle.

In 2020, a Leafcutter Ant exhibit debuted as a new permanent exhibit.

== Farm Country ==
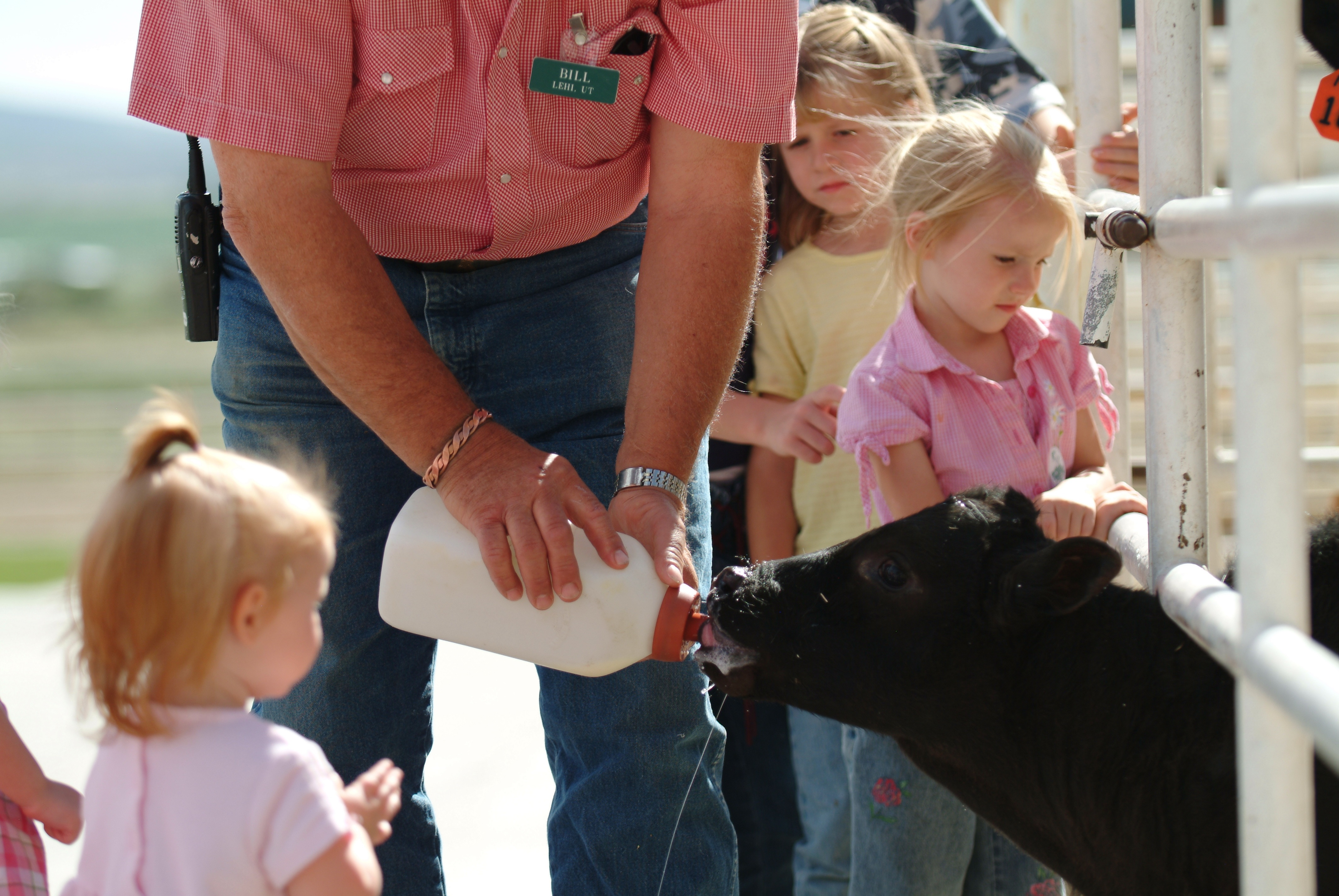
Calf feeding demonstration in Farm Country

Farm Country is a working farm open to visitors. During the summer, a Junior Master Gardener Club maintains the garden and grows tomatoes, basil, peppers, watermelon, and pumpkins. Other demonstration gardens include a USDA People's Garden. There are daily live cow-milking demonstrations, traditional farm animals, and wagon and pony rides.

== Museum of Ancient Life ==
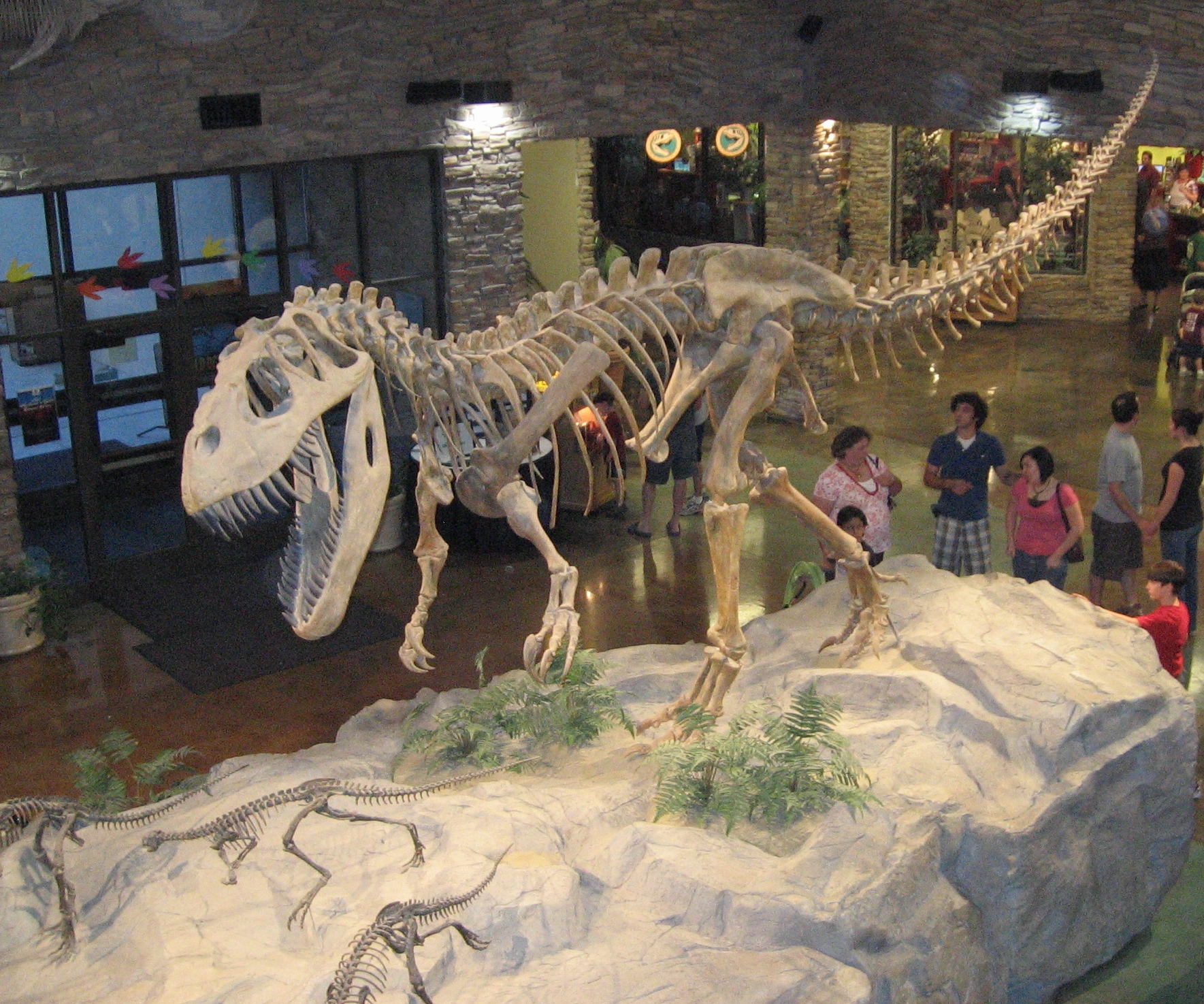
Lobby area in the Museum of Ancient Life (dinosaur skeletal mounts seen in the photograph: Nanosaurus fleeing from Torvosaurus)

The Museum of Ancient Life at Thanksgiving Point first opened in 2000. A group of Utah paleontologists approached Thanksgiving Point with an idea to build a world-class dinosaur museum. Together, they planned and assembled the exhibits of the Museum of Ancient Life, one of the world's largest collections of mounted fossil casts. The museum's goal was to take collections out of cases and put them into an immersive environment.

The museum also previously featured a large movie screen auditorium named the Mammoth Screen 3D Theater. During museum hours, the theater showed large format science films relevant to the museum's collections and exhibition.

== Museum of Natural Curiosity ==
Thanksgiving Point's Museum of Natural Curiosity opened in May 2014. The museum features five exhibit areas: Rainforest, Waterworks, Kidopolis, Traveling Exhibits, and Discovery Garden.

=== Discovery Garden ===
Discovery Garden is the outdoor gallery of the Museum of Natural Curiosity. It is an educational area designed to teach youth about the natural environment. The garden includes two hedgerow mazes, an "eco-pond", and a replica of Timpanogos Cave. Discovery Garden also includes the Arbor Day Foundation-certified Nature Explore Classroom, the first certified in Utah and one of only 65 in the continental United States.

== Classes and Events ==
Thanksgiving Point also offers a variety of classes for both youth and adults on topics such as cooking, animal husbandry, robotics, gardening, fitness, arts and crafts, and glass-blowing.

Thanksgiving Point produces and holds events throughout the year. Examples include a spring tulip festival, a seasonal corn maze, a holiday lights experience called Luminaria, and other seasonal events.

Luminaria, a walk-through Christmas light display in Ashton Gardens, began in 2016. For its 2026 season, the display used 10 million lights across 50 acres. In a 2026 comparison of 17 holiday light displays in Utah, Luminaria had the highest admission price among displays with posted prices: $134 for two adults and three children on its busiest nights, and $99 on its lowest-priced nights.

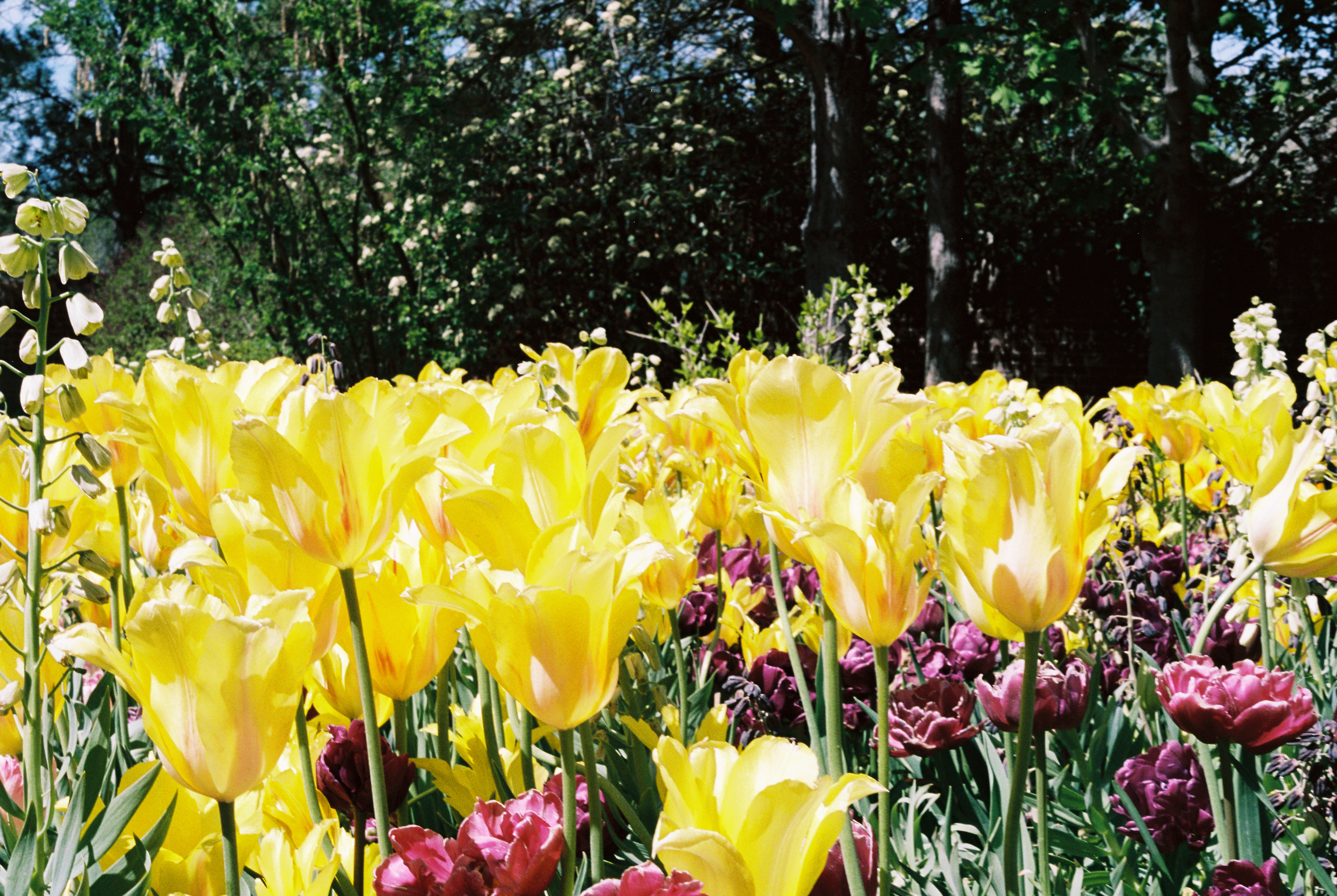
Tulips at Thanksgiving Point tulip festival

Private social and corporate events such as weddings, parties, and corporate functions are held in conference and meeting rooms throughout Thanksgiving Point.

== Other ==
Several other businesses are located on Thanksgiving Point's campus but are managed by various entities.

=== Thanksgiving Point Golf Course ===
Thanksgiving Point Golf Course is operated and managed by a private management company and Troon. It is the largest public golf course in Utah at 7,728 yards (7,066 m) long and more than 200 acres (0.81 km^{2}). The course was designed by professional golfer Johnny Miller.

=== Roots of Humanity Exhibit ===
Next to the Ashton Gardens parking lot is the grounds for the future Roots of Humanity Exhibit. The exhibit will be an 80-foot building with walls only of stained glass, totaling at more than 11,000 square feet.
