= LGBTQ rights in Utah =

- Utah (US)
- Legal status: Legal since 2003
- Gender identity: Transgender people can change their legal gender without surgery. However healthcare is much harder to access due to legal restrictions than in other states
- Discrimination protections: Sexual orientation and gender identity protections (employment and housing only, public accommodations not included; religious organizations, groups, and individuals exempt)

Family rights
- Recognition of relationships: Same-sex marriage since 2014
- Adoption: Same-sex couples permitted to adopt

The rights of lesbian, gay, bisexual, transgender, and queer (LGBTQ) people in the U.S. state of Utah have significantly evolved in the 21st century. Protective laws have become increasingly enacted since 2014, despite the state's reputation as socially conservative and highly religious. Utah's anti-sodomy law was invalidated in 2003 by Lawrence v. Texas, and fully repealed by the state legislature in 2019. Same-sex marriage has been legal since the state's ban was ruled unconstitutional by federal courts in 2014. In addition, statewide anti-discrimination laws now cover sexual orientation and gender identity in employment and housing, and the use of conversion therapy on minors is prohibited. In spite of this, there are still a few differences between the treatment of LGBTQ people and the rest of the population, and the rights of transgender youth are restricted.

Opinion polling has shown an increase in support for LGBT rights in the state. A 2017 Public Religion Research Institute poll showed that 44% of Utah residents supported same-sex marriage, a significant increase from the early 2000s. A 2019 survey by the same pollster showed that 74% of Utahns supported anti-discrimination legislation protecting LGBTQ people. Salt Lake City, the largest city in the state, has one of the largest LGBTQ populations per capita in the country.

== Law regarding same-sex sexual activity ==
Criminalization of same-sex sexual activity began since people of European descent first established a federally recognized government in the region. In 1851, the theocratic Utah Territorial Legislature of the newly formed Utah Territory passed the first law addressing same-sex sexual activity. Brigham Young acted as both the Territorial Governor and the president of the Church of Jesus Christ of Latter-day Saints (LDS Church) and oversaw the selection of legislators. The law banned any "man or boy" from "sexual intercourse with any of the male creation" with penalties left to the courts' discretion. Only one year later, a new criminal code was passed. It made no mention to sodomy or common-law crimes, thus legalizing sodomy in Utah. The lack of such a law was noted in 1864, when a soldier, Frederick Jones, was arrested on the grounds of sodomy but later released as there was no law punishing it. Shortly after his release, Jones was murdered by the father of his sexual partner. In 1876, the Utah Territorial Legislature enacted a new criminal code, which this time contained provisions outlawing sodomy. Punishment was set at five years' imprisonment, and 10 years for attempted sodomy. The law applied to both heterosexual and homosexual conduct, as well as to private and consensual activity. In 1913, in the case of State v. Johnson, the Utah Supreme Court held that fellatio (oral sex) was not a criminal offense. Despite expressing its disgust toward the practice and the fact that Johnson was "a negro", the court ruled that fellatio could not be criminal without defined legislation. In response, the state passed a law in 1923 prohibiting "sodomy or any other detestable and abominable crime against nature" that was committed "with either the sexual organs or the mouth", with a penalty varying between three and twenty years' imprisonment.

In 1969, the Utah State Legislature reduced the penalty for sodomy from a felony to a misdemeanor. It also removed the reference to "detestable and abominable crime against nature" and reduced the penalty for consensual acts to a maximum of six months in county jail, and/or a fine of up to $299. In 1973, a comprehensive revision of the law resulted in married couples being exempt from prosecution. The revision also established that an act of sodomy could be completed by "any touching". The sodomy statute would remain in force until 2003 when the U.S. Supreme Court invalidated all state sodomy laws with its landmark 6 to 3 opinion in Lawrence v. Texas. The opinion stated that private consensual sexual conduct is protected by the due process and equal protection rights that are guaranteed by the United States Constitution.

In 1925, the Utah State Legislature passed a sterilization law, providing for the possible sterilization of state inmates afflicted with "habitual sexual criminal tendencies". The statute was upheld by the state Supreme Court in 1929 in the case of Davis v. Walton. By the end of 1948, 555 persons had been sterilized in Utah, all of them "insane or mentally retarded". The law was amended in 1975 to apply only to the "mentally redarded".

Openly gay Utah Senator Scott McCoy (D-Salt Lake) unsuccessfully sponsored the bill S.B. 169 ("Sodomy Amendments") in 2007. The bill would have amended the state sodomy law by repealing its unconstitutional parts. The bill failed without consideration.

After lobbying in 2011 by gay activist David Nelson, the Utah Department of Public Safety amended its administrative rule which restricted the issuance of the state concealed-firearm permit to individuals who were ever convicted of violating the state sodomy law.

On January 29, 2019, the state House approved a bill to repeal unconstitutional provisions in regard to sodomy and adultery in a 74–0 vote with 1 abstention. It was approved by the Senate on February 22 in a 25–2 vote with 2 abstentions, and signed by Governor Gary Herbert on March 25, 2019.

== Recognition of same-sex relationships ==
Same-sex marriage in Utah has been legal since October 6, 2014, following the resolution of a lawsuit challenging the state's ban on same-sex marriage. Same-sex marriage was also legal in Utah from December 20, 2013, to January 6, 2014.

In response to the 1993 Baehr v. Miike court case on same-sex marriage in Hawaii, Representative Norm L. Nielsen (R-Utah County) sponsored the bill H.B. 366 ("Recognition of Marriages") in 1995. The bill passed the State Legislature. It prohibited state recognition of same-sex marriages which were performed in other states and nations. It was the first such law in the United States.

Utah voters approved a ballot referendum, Utah Constitutional Amendment 3, in 2004 that constitutionally defined marriage as the legal union between a man and a woman and restricted unmarried domestic unions. The referendum was approved by a margin of 65.8 percent to 33.2 percent.

On March 25, 2013, three same-sex couples, including one already married in Iowa, filed a lawsuit in the United States District Court for the District of Utah seeking to declare Utah's prohibition on the recognition of same-sex marriages unconstitutional under the Due Process and Equal Protection clauses of the United States Constitution. The court heard arguments on December 4. The state argued that there was "nothing unusual" in enforcing policies that encourage "responsible procreation" and the "optimal mode of child-rearing". Plaintiffs' attorney contended that the policy is "based on prejudice and bias that is religiously grounded in this state". On December 20, 2013, District Judge Robert J. Shelby found the same-sex marriage ban unconstitutional and ordered the state to cease enforcing the ban. The U.S. Supreme Court stayed the order of the District Court on January 6, 2014, pending the appeal of its decision to the Tenth Circuit. On June 25, 2014, the Tenth Circuit upheld the lower court ruling, a decision that sets a precedent for every state within the circuit. However, the Tenth Circuit stayed this ruling. The U.S. Supreme Court refused the appeal from the state on October 6, 2014, requiring Utah to license and recognize same-sex marriages.

== Adoption and parenting ==
Individuals and couples need to be married or single to be foster parents within Utah. Cohabiting or common-law couples are legally banned from being foster parents.

Representative Nora B. Stephens (R-Davis County) sponsored a bill, H.B. 103 ("Amendments to Child Welfare"), in 1998. It passed the State Legislature. The law requires state agencies to give adoption priority to married couples and to prohibit adoptions by cohabitating unmarried couples. Openly lesbian Representative Jackie Biskupski (D-Salt Lake) spoke against the bill.

A single person can adopt in Utah, except that by Utah law "a person who is cohabiting in a relationship that is not a legally valid and binding marriage" cannot adopt. Utah law states that "a child may be adopted by adults who are legally married to each other in accordance with the laws of this state, including adoption by a stepparent."

On December 20, 2013, same-sex marriage became legal in Utah; thus legalizing same-sex adoption for same-sex couples. However, the U.S. Supreme court stayed the order. On October 6, 2014, the Supreme Court refused to hear the case, and the hold was lifted. In 2013, Utah's capital, Salt Lake City, and its suburbs had the highest rate — 26 percent — of same-sex couples sharing parenthood, according to an analysis of census data by the Williams Institute at the UCLA School of Law.

Lesbian couples have access to in vitro fertilization. State law recognizes the non-genetic, non-gestational mother as a legal parent to a child born via donor insemination, but only if the parents are married. Gestational surrogacy arrangements are valid and legal in Utah but only for married couples. In August 2019, the Utah Supreme Court, basing its decision on the Equal Protection Clause of the U.S. Constitution, ruled unconstitutional a piece of state law barring same-sex couples from reaching a surrogacy agreement with a woman they wish to carry their child. The decision says in part that "same-sex couples must be afforded all of the benefits the state has linked to marriage."

== Discrimination protections ==
Map of Utah cities and counties that had sexual orientation and/or gender identity anti–employment discrimination ordinances before enactment of the statewide anti-discrimination law Sexual orientation and gender identity with anti–employment discrimination ordinance Did not protect sexual orientation and gender identity in employment

On March 6, 2015, the Utah State Senate passed Utah SB 296 in a 23–5 vote. The law bans discrimination based on sexual orientation and gender identity in employment and housing (public accommodation not included) with exemptions for religious organizations and their affiliates such as schools and hospitals, as well as the Boy Scouts. The bill also would protect employees from being fired for talking about religious or moral beliefs, as long as the speech was reasonable and not harassing or disruptive. The measure was backed by the LDS Church. It was approved by the state House on March 11, in a 65–10 vote. On March 12, 2015, Governor Gary Herbert signed the bill into law.

Prior to that, Representative Christine Johnson (D-Salt Lake) sponsored an anti-discrimination bill, H.B. 89 ("Antidiscrimination Act Amendments"), in 2008. The bill, however, failed to pass the State Legislature. It would have prohibited employment discrimination based on sexual orientation or gender identity. She reintroduced the bill unsuccessfully in 2009 and 2010. She also sponsored H.B. 128 ("Antidiscrimination Study Related to Employment and Housing") in 2010. The bill would have required a study of employment and housing discrimination based on sexual orientation or gender identity.

Governor Gary Herbert appointed openly gay Brian Doughty in 2011 to replace Utah Representative Jackie Biskupski (D-Salt Lake) when she resigned from the Utah House of Representatives.

In March 2020, the Utah State Legislature passed a bill banning offensive number plates on vehicles on the basis of sexual orientation or gender identity, among other categories such as religion, sex or race.

=== Common Ground Initiative ===
In response to the adoption in 2008 of California's Proposition 8, Equality Utah leaders launched the group's Common Ground Initiative. The initiative included the introduction of five bills to the Utah Legislature to protect the equal rights of LGBTQ people in the state. Human Rights Campaign leaders delivered 27,000 letters to church leaders in support of the legislation; the Church had previously published a statement saying that it did not object to the bills. The measures of the initiative failed, some in committee.

In response to the LDS Church statements, Equality Utah leaders lobbied successfully for the adoption of similar bills in 12 counties and cities in the state including: Salt Lake County, Salt Lake City, West Valley City, Ogden, Taylorsville, Logan, Murray, Summit County, Midvale, Grand County, Park City and Moab.

=== University of Utah ===
University of Utah administrators adopted a policy in 1991 to prohibit employment discrimination including that based on sexual orientation. Administrators extended the policy in 1996 to prohibit discrimination in faculty duties, in 1997 to prohibit discrimination in student rights and responsibilities, and in 2009 to prohibit discrimination in student admissions.

=== Utah State University and Southern Utah University discrimination against Trans Athlete (October 3, 2024) ===
Two Utah college volleyball teams have forfeited scheduled matches with San José State University amid a controversy related to a transgender player.

Southern Utah University and Utah State University decided not to participate in upcoming games against the California school after current and former athletes from different states, including one from the San José State volleyball team, sued the National Collegiate Athletics Association over the participation of transgender women in sports, what they described as a violation of Title IX, the federal law that prohibits discrimination based on sex on educational programs.

Transgender students can participate in a sport-by-sport approach determined by the national governing body of the sport, according to NCAA guidelines. The athletes must also meet testosterone levels standards prior to competitions.

=== Salt Lake City ===
Utah gay activist David Nelson wrote and lobbied unsuccessfully in 1986 for the adoption of a Salt Lake City Council ordinance to create a city human rights commission and to prohibit discrimination, the first such proposal in Utah.

Nelson lobbied successfully from 1986 to 1987 for the adoption of a Salt Lake City Police Department LGBT sensitivity training policy, the first such policy in Utah.

Salt Lake City Council members adopted two bills in 2009 and 2010 which prohibit employment and housing discrimination (except by religious groups) based on sexual orientation or gender identity. LDS Church leaders said before the adoption that they supported the bills and that they could be a model for the rest of the state.

=== Salt Lake County ===
Utah gay activist David Nelson lobbied successfully in 1992 for the adoption of a Salt Lake County Commission ordinance to prohibit discrimination including that based on sexual orientation, the first such laws in Utah, and successfully campaigned in 1995 against the repeal of the "marital status" and "sexual orientation" protections. Leaders of the county Gay and Lesbian Employee Association were critical of Nelson and others who opposed the repeal, and said that he "did not speak for GLEA" "or for any of its members."

=== Bullying in educational settings ===
Utah has enacted anti-bullying legislation several times since 2006, detailing prohibited behavior and increasing the reporting requirements for local school boards. LGBT rights advocates have campaigned for faster and more sensitive responses from school officials and highlighted the problem of gay teen suicide. A law passed in 2013 requires school administrators to notify parents if their child is bullied. The new requirement arose as a direct response to the suicide of gay 14-year-old David Phan, whose family had never known he was the object of bullying. Some LGBT activists have objected that it might result in students being outed to their families, which may not always be in the child's best interest. They have recommended that schools train teachers in the importance of family acceptance, establish guidelines for parental notification, and discuss what they will say with the student.

In 2018, as a result of a lawsuit settlement brought upon the state, the Utah State Board of Education was charged with developing and implementing guidelines to address bullying, cyberbullying and abusive conduct in schools and train staff. The guidelines, known as Rule 277–613, included provisions relating to teacher training, references to gender and sexual orientation and reporting requirements for bullying. In August 2019, despite attempts from the Southern Poverty Law Center-designated hate group Pacific Justice Institute, a citizen watch group successfully lobbied for the preservation of the guidelines.

=== Utah consumer privacy law ===
Effective from December 31, 2023 - Utah will implement "strong, clear and robust" consumer privacy legislation for both individuals and businesses. The legislation explicitly include "sexual orientation" within the list of protections.

== Hate crime law ==
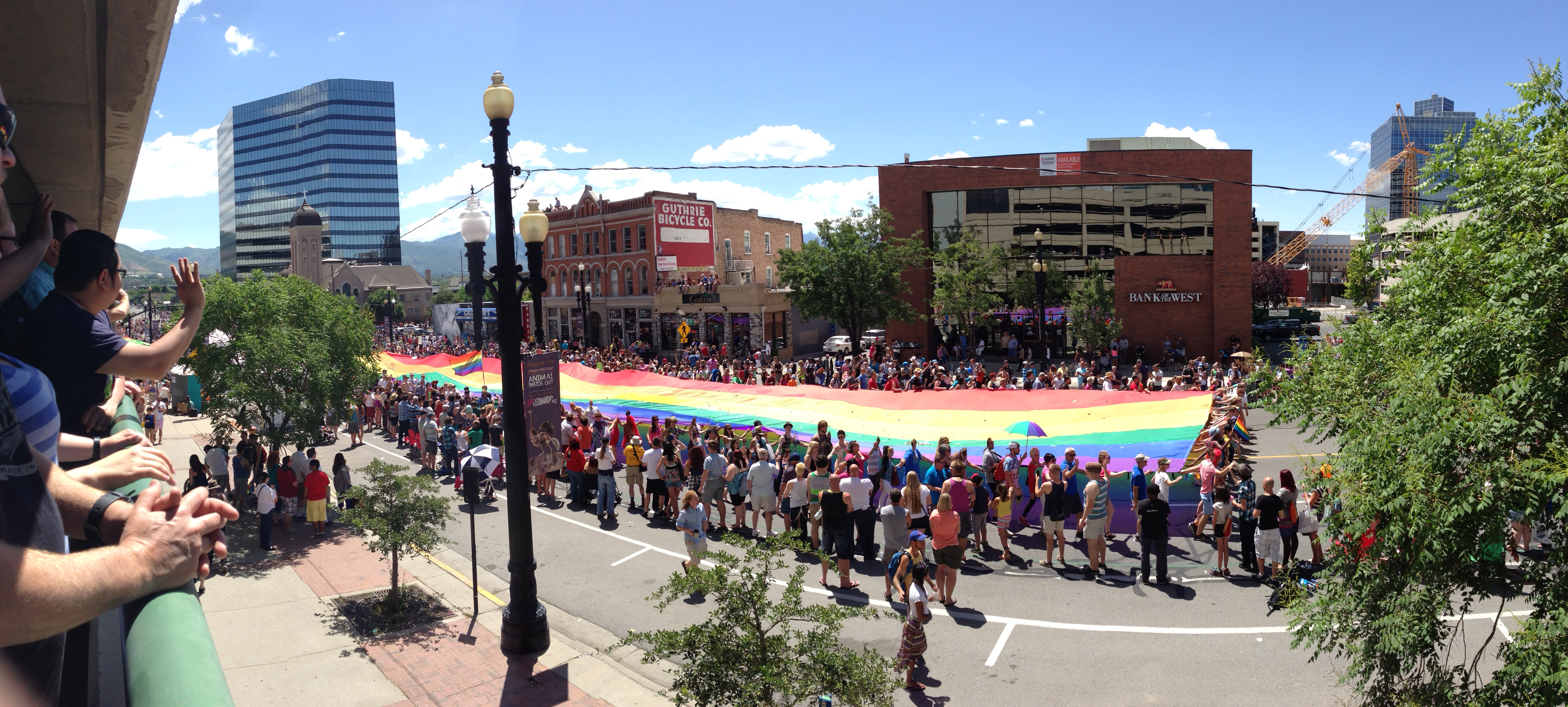
A rainbow flag at the 2014 Salt Lake City Pride parade

In 1992, the Utah House of Representatives Democratic Leader, Representative Frank R. Pignanelli (D-Salt Lake), successfully sponsored the bills, H.B. 111 ("Hate Crimes Statistics Act") and H.B. 112 ("Hate Crimes Penalties — Civil Rights Violation"). The laws require the state Department of Public Safety to collect and publish statistics about hate crimes which are committed in the state, and provide for an enhanced penalty for the commission of a hate crime. Utah gay activist David Nelson helped write the bills. Attempts were made unsuccessfully from 1992 to 1999 for the adoption of an amendment to the laws.

On March 5, 2019, the state Senate approved a bill to criminalize hate crimes based on sexual orientation or gender identity, in an 18–11 vote. It was approved by the House with an amendment on March 12 in a 64–9 vote with 2 abstentions. The Senate concurred with the amendment the same day by 22 votes to 3. The bill was signed by the Governor on April 2, 2019.

== Transgender rights ==
In order for transgender people in Utah to change the gender marker on their birth certificates, they must submit to the Utah Office of Vital Records a certified court order changing their name and gender. Sex reassignment surgery is not required. Upon the receipt of the court order, "the amendment shall be registered with and become a part of the original certificate and a certified copy shall be issued to the applicant without additional cost".

In 2009, Representative Carl Wimmer (R-Salt Lake) unsuccessfully sponsored a bill, H.B. 225 ("Driver License Amendments"), which would have provided that "if a person requests to change the sex designation on a driver's license or identification card, the Driver License Division shall issue a duplicate driver license or new identification card upon receiving: an application and fee for a duplicate driver license or identification card; and written verification from a licensed physician that the applicant has undergone and completed sex reassignment surgery."

In 2011, Utah Driver License Division employees denied mistreatment of a transgender woman who was required to remove her makeup before she could be photographed for a new state identification card. A witness said that the employees appeared to be making fun of the transgender woman. The woman was invited to meet with the division director.

Besides male (M) and female (F), Utah identity documents are available with an "X" sex descriptor. An individual seeking such a marker must receive approval from a judge.

In May 2021, the Utah Supreme Court held 4–1 that state judges must grant sex and name changes on personal birth certificates to transgender individuals who have met certain clinical requirements. The State declined to present any counter-argument.

=== Sports ===
In March 2022, House Bill 11 passed the Utah Legislature "at the final moment" banning transgender athletes from playing sports, athletics and Olympics. On March 22, Governor Spencer Cox vetoed the bill. The Utah Legislature overrode the governor's veto and the ban took effect July 1. On August 19, a judge reversed the ban and said that transgender girls can be considered for girls' sports on a case-by-case basis in the 2022–2023 school year.

=== Transgender healthcare ===
In Utah, doctors cannot provide gender-affirming care to trans people under 18; while they may choose to provide such care to trans people under 25, the law gives any trans person under 25 the ability to retroactively "disaffirm" consent and sue the doctor for care that they had at the time consented to. On January 26, 2023, the House passed the current version of the legislation, and the next morning, the Senate passed the same version in a 20–8 vote. On January 28, Governor Spencer Cox signed the bill. It took effect immediately. Youth who were already receiving gender-affirming care when the law passed in January 2023 were able to continue receiving it, but other youth wouldn't be permitted to begin until they are 18.

This made Utah the first state to have an active ban on gender-affirming healthcare for trans youth. While Alabama and Arkansas had legislation to ban hormones and puberty blockers, Arizona and Tennessee had legislation about surgeries, and Texas and Florida were pursuing other avenues, none of those bans were being enforced at the time that Utah's ban took effect. Two weeks after Governor Cox signed Utah's bill, Governor Noem of South Dakota signed a similar bill.

A legal review by the legislature had found the bill potentially unconstitutional, due to its banning care strictly for transgender people.

In March 2024, a U.S. Department of Justice investigation found that the Utah Department of Corrections had discriminated against an inmate by denying gender-affirming hormones.

==== Systematic review ====
In May 2025, a two-year systematic review commissioned as part of the aforementioned ban on youth healthcare concluded that "The consensus of the evidence supports that the treatments are effective in terms of mental health, psychosocial outcomes, and the induction of body changes consistent with the affirmed gender in pediatric [gender dysphoria] patients. The evidence also supports that the treatments are safe in terms of changes to bone density, cardiovascular risk factors, metabolic changes, and cancer". The review's findings were thereafter dismissed by the Utah state legislature, who kept the ban in place.

=== 2024 bathroom bill ===
On January 30, Governor Spencer Cox signed a bathroom bill that the Utah Legislature passed earlier that month. The law requires people to go by their sex assigned at birth when they use bathrooms and locker rooms in government-owned buildings, including public schools. (The bill does "not affect private businesses or entities whatsoever".) Under the law, if a person is challenged, they can show their birth certificate, and if the sex on their birth certificate has been changed (as many states allow), the person must also show proof of gender-affirming surgery. In May 2024, Utah provided a way for officials and individuals to file formal complaints about people they suspect of being in the incorrect bathroom within schools and other government buildings.

=== Housing ===
In 2024, after a transgender woman was assigned to the girls' dorm at Utah State University, a mother made a viral social media post complaining that her daughter had to share a suite with the trans woman in question. In response, the State of Utah passed a bill banning transgender students from dorms aligning with their gender identity.

== Freedom of expression ==
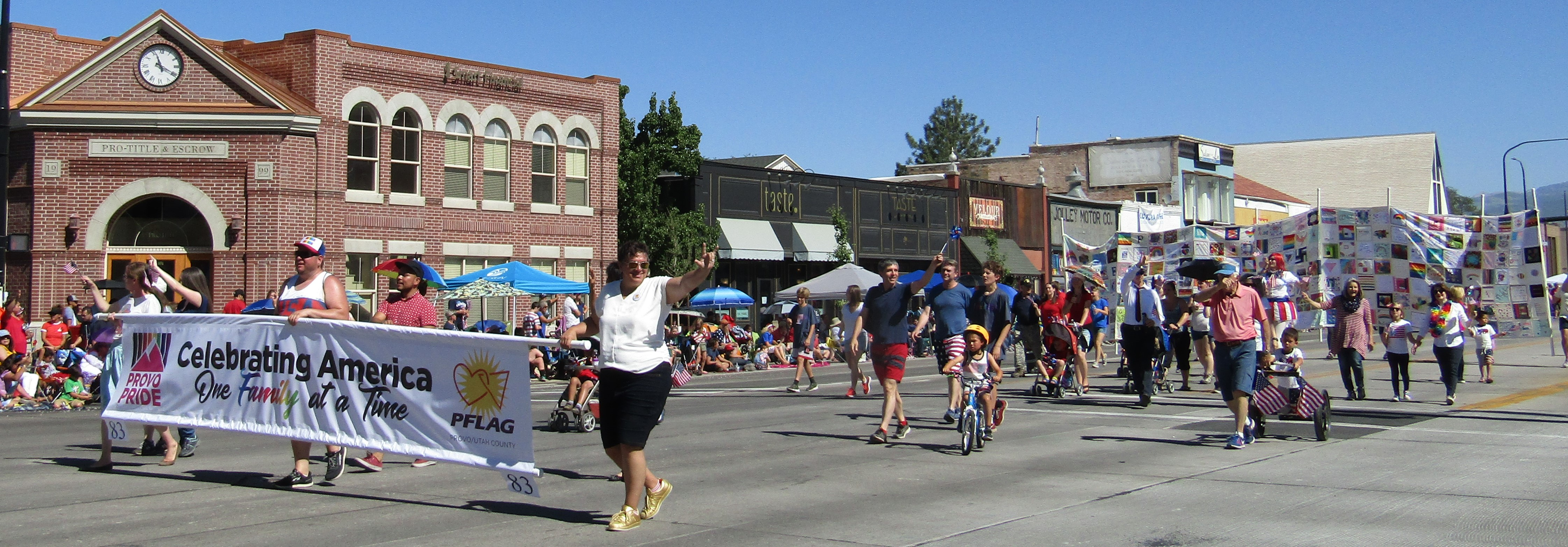
The 2018 edition of Provo Pride

=== LGBTQ pride flag ban ===
In March 2025, a new Utah law implemented an explicit ban on any LGBTQ pride flags within the grounds of all public schools and government buildings.

In response, in May 2025, the Sego Belonging Flag and the Sego Visibility Flag were adopted as official flags of Salt Lake City, Utah. The Sego Belonging Flag is based on the Progress Pride flag, and the Sego Visibility Flag is based on the transgender pride flag.

=== Student clubs ===
Provo High School students created a gay–straight alliance in 2005. Provo is considered to be one of the most conservative cities in the country. In response, some residents asked the Provo School District Board of Education to shut down the group. However, the board members concluded it would violate federal law to do so, and instead created a new policy requiring parental signatures to join any school clubs.

Students attending East High School in Salt Lake City School District attempted to create a gay-straight alliance (GSA) in 1998. The school did not permit them to do so. In order to not violate the Equal Access Act (EAA), the school banned all non-curricular student groups. This issue was taken to court as the East High Gay Straight Alliance v. Board of Education of Salt Lake City School District. After two years of litigation, the school district permitted the students at East High School to officially form their GSA.

=== No promo homo law repealed ===
On October 21, 2016, Equality Utah filed a lawsuit with the U.S. District Court for the District of Utah against the Utah State Board of Education to strike down a law forbidding the "promotion" of homosexuality in schools. In March 2017, the Utah State Legislature passed legislation to remove the phrase "the advocacy of homosexuality" from the law. On March 20, 2017, Governor Gary Herbert signed the bill into law, and it went into effect on July 1, 2017.

The repealed statute stated "[T]he materials adopted by a local school board . . . shall be based upon recommendations of the school district’s Curriculum Materials Review Committee that comply with state law and state board rules emphasizing abstinence before marriage and fidelity after marriage, and prohibiting instruction in the advocacy of homosexuality."

=== Murray transgender book incident ===
In February 2021, several parents in Murray complained after an elementary school teacher read Call Me Max, a book featuring a young transgender boy, to the class following a request by one of the students. The school district subsequently cancelled a program aimed at introducing kids to more diverse characters and literature.

=== History of LGBTQ-specific Utah publications ===
LGBTQ people and organizations in Utah have exercised LGBT freedom of expression rights through many LGBTQ-run, Utah publications since 1975. Contemporary ones include Salt Lake Metro (2004–2006), and QSaltLake (2006–present).

== Conversion therapy ==
In July 2019, the Utah Psychologists Licensing Board agreed to draft rules banning conversion therapy in the state, which were then sent to public consultation.

On January 21, 2020, Governor Gary Herbert signed an executive order prohibiting conversion therapy on minors in Utah, which became the 19th state to do so. Previously, a bill to ban the pseudoscientific practice in the Utah State Senate resulted in extensive changes by conservative lawmakers, to the point where its primary sponsor, Craig Hall, no longer supported it. The ban does not apply to clergy, religious counselors, parents or grandparents as long as they are not acting as psychologists. In November 2019, Herbert said that the "stories of youth who have endured these so-called therapies are heart-rending" and that he's "grateful that we have found a way forward that will ban conversion therapy forever in our state". Every major American medical and mental health organization, including the American Medical Association and the American Academy of Child and Adolescent Psychiatry, have found no evidence to support conversion therapy and consider it a discredited medical practice. In February 2023, a bill formally passed both houses of the Utah Legislature to "codify" the ban on conversion therapy on LGBT minors into legislation. The Governor of Utah signed the bill into law.

== Public opinion ==
Support for legal recognition of same-sex relationships
When	Organizer	Same-sex marriage	Civil union	No legal recognition
November 2004	UCEP	21%	25%	54%
January 2009	UVC	20%	43%	37%
November 2010	UCEP	24%	41%	35%
February 2012	UCEP	28%	43%	29%

An opinion poll which was conducted in 2010 by Columbia University found that Utah ranked last among all states in support of same-sex marriage. With 22% of respondents who favored it, the rate of support had increased 10% since 1994–1996.

An opinion poll conducted in 2011 by Public Policy Polling found that 27% of Utah voters believed same-sex marriage should be legal, while 66% believed it should be illegal and 7% were not sure. A separate question in the survey found that 60% of respondents supported legal recognition of same-sex couples, with 23% supporting same-sex marriage and 37% supporting civil unions, while 39% opposed all legal recognition and 1% were not sure.

A poll for The Salt Lake Tribune conducted by SurveyUSA from January 10–13, 2014 found that Utah residents were evenly split on whether same-sex couples in Utah should be allowed to receive state-issued marriage licences — 48% for and 48% against. 4% were uncertain. Some 72% said same-sex couples should be allowed to form civil unions that provide the same legal rights as marriage.

A 2017 Public Religion Research Institute poll found that 54% of Utah residents supported same-sex marriage, while 38% were opposed and 8% were unsure. In addition, 80% were in favor of anti-discrimination laws covering sexual orientation and gender identity. 15% were against.

Public opinion for LGBTQ anti-discrimination laws in Utah
Poll source	Date(s) administered	Sample size	Margin of error	% support	% opposition	% no opinion
Public Religion Research Institute	January 2-December 30, 2019	628	?	74%	19%	7%
Public Religion Research Institute	January 3-December 30, 2018	646	?	77%	19%	4%
Public Religion Research Institute	April 5-December 23, 2017	732	?	80%	15%	5%
Public Religion Research Institute	April 29, 2015-January 7, 2016	813	?	82%	17%	1%

== Summary of LGBT rights in Utah ==
Same-sex sexual activity legal	Yes (Since 2003; codified in 2019)
Equal age of consent (18)	Yes (Since 2003)
Anti-discrimination laws in all areas for both sexual orientation and gender identity	Yes / No (In employment and housing, not public accommodations; also consumer privacy for sexual orientation only since December 31, 2023)
Hate crime law includes both sexual orientation and gender identity	Yes (Since 2019)
Same-sex marriages	Yes / No (Allowed since 2014, but explicitly banned on the Navajo Nation since 2005)
Stepchild and joint adoption by same-sex couples	Yes
Lesbian, gay and bisexual people allowed to serve openly in the military	Yes (Since 2011)
Transgender people allowed to serve openly in the military	(Since 2025)
Intersex people allowed to serve openly in the military	(Current DoD policy bans "hermaphrodites" from serving or enlisting in the military)
Right to change legal gender	Yes (Requires court order)
Third gender option	Yes (Requires court order)
Conversion therapy banned on minors	Yes (Since 2020)
Access to IVF for lesbian couples	Yes
Surrogacy arrangements legal for gay male couples	Yes
MSMs allowed to donate blood	Yes (Since 2023)

== See also ==
- Homosexuality and the LDS Church
- Kitchen v. Herbert
- LGBT rights and the LDS Church
- LGBT rights in the United States
- Politics of Utah
- Rights and responsibilities of marriages in the United States
- Timeline of LGBT Mormon history
