= Taylor G. Petrey =

American religious scholar (born 1976)

- Born: 20 August 1976 (age 50); Provo, Utah, USA
- Occupation: Professor
- Years active: 2010–present

Academic background
- Education: Pace University; Harvard Divinity School
- Doctoral advisor: Karen L. King

Academic work
- Discipline: Religious Studies
- Sub-discipline: New Testament; Early Christianity; Gender Studies; Mormonism
- Institutions: Kalamazoo College
- Website: https://religion.kzoo.edu/faculty/dr-taylor-petrey-2/

Taylor G. Petrey is an American scholar of religion specializing in gender studies, early Christianity, and Mormonism. He served as the editor of Dialogue: A Journal of Mormon Thought from 2019 until 2025 and is a professor at Kalamazoo College. Petrey’s research explores the intersections of religion, sexuality, and gender, particularly within the Church of Jesus Christ of Latter-day Saints (LDS Church). His 2020 book Tabernacles of Clay: Sexuality and Gender in Modern Mormonism has won numerous awards, including Best Book Award from the Mormon History Association and a Choice Outstanding Academic Title award.

== Education and academic career ==
Petrey earned a bachelor of arts (2001) from Pace University, followed by a master of theological studies (2003) from Harvard Divinity School and a doctor of theology (2010) from Harvard Divinity School. From 2016–17, he was a visiting associate professor at Harvard Divinity School and research associate at the Women's Studies in Religion Program. He specializes in gender studies, Early Christianity, and Mormonism. Since 2010, he has been a professor at Kalamazoo College, where he has also served as chair of the Religion Department and director of the Women, Gender, and Sexuality program.

He is the author of numerous books and articles on early Christianity and also the Church of Jesus Christ of Latter-day Saints. His work has been published in academic journals such as Religion and American Culture, Harvard Theological Review, and the Journal of Early Christian Studies. He is a contributor to the Next Quest for the Historical Jesus.

== Research and scholarship ==
Petrey’s scholarship critically examines religious conceptions of gender, sexuality, and kinship, particularly in Mormon thought and early Christianity. His work is notable for engaging with feminist theory, queer studies, and the history of theological concepts related to the body, family, and reproduction.

Mormonism, gender, and queer kinship

In Tabernacles of Clay: Sexuality and Gender in Modern Mormonism (2020), Petrey traces the evolution of LDS teachings on gender and sexuality from the mid-20th century to the present, arguing that Mormon conceptions of sex, gender, and the body have been deeply shaped by American political and cultural shifts. He highlights how LDS teachings have adapted in response to feminism, LGBTQ rights, and broader social changes while maintaining a theological commitment to heteronormativity and binary gender roles. The book has been recognized as a landmark study in Mormon studies and religious gender theory, earning the Best Book Award from the Mormon History Association and a Choice Outstanding Academic Title award.

Building on these themes, Petrey’s Queering Kinship in the Mormon Cosmos (2024) expands the discussion of Mormon theology and kinship structures through the lens of queer theory. This book reimagines Mormon cosmology by exploring how its eternal family doctrine, temple rituals, and notions of divine relationships might be interpreted outside heteronormative frameworks. Petrey challenges traditional LDS interpretations of gender and kinship, suggesting that Mormon theology, with its emphasis on eternal relationships and divinization, has the potential to support non-traditional forms of kinship beyond heterosexual marriage. The book contributes to broader scholarly conversations on queer religious thought, placing Mormonism in dialogue with contemporary debates on sexuality, embodiment, and theological anthropology.

Early Christianity, the body, and reproduction

Petrey’s earlier work, Resurrecting Parts: Early Christians on Desire, Reproduction, and Sexual Difference (2015), examines early Christian debates about the body, gender, and reproduction. He explores how ancient Christian thinkers theorized about sexual difference, bodily resurrection, and human sexuality. The book argues that early Christian views on sexual desire and bodily resurrection were shaped by philosophical and medical theories of the ancient world, particularly ideas about the gendered nature of bodies and the function of sexual desire and reproduction. Petrey highlights how Christian teachings on celibacy, resurrection, and eschatology challenged or reinforced prevailing Greco-Roman ideas about gender and biological sex.

Taken together, Petrey’s work has been influential in both Mormon studies and early Christian studies, particularly in discussions of queer theology, feminist readings of scripture, and religious concepts of kinship.

== Publications ==
Books

- (2024). Queering Kinship in the Mormon Cosmos. University of North Carolina Press.
- (2020). Tabernacles of Clay: Sexuality and Gender in Mormonism. University of North Carolina Press.
- (2015). Resurrecting Parts: Early Christians on Desire, Reproduction, and Sexual Difference.

Edited Volumes

- (2023). The Bible and Latter-day Saint Tradition. University of Utah Press.
- (2020). The Routledge Handbook of Mormonism and Gender. Routledge.
- (2019). Remaking the World: Christianity and Categories: Essays in Honor of Karen L. King. Mohr Siebeck.
