= Encircle =

American nonprofit organization

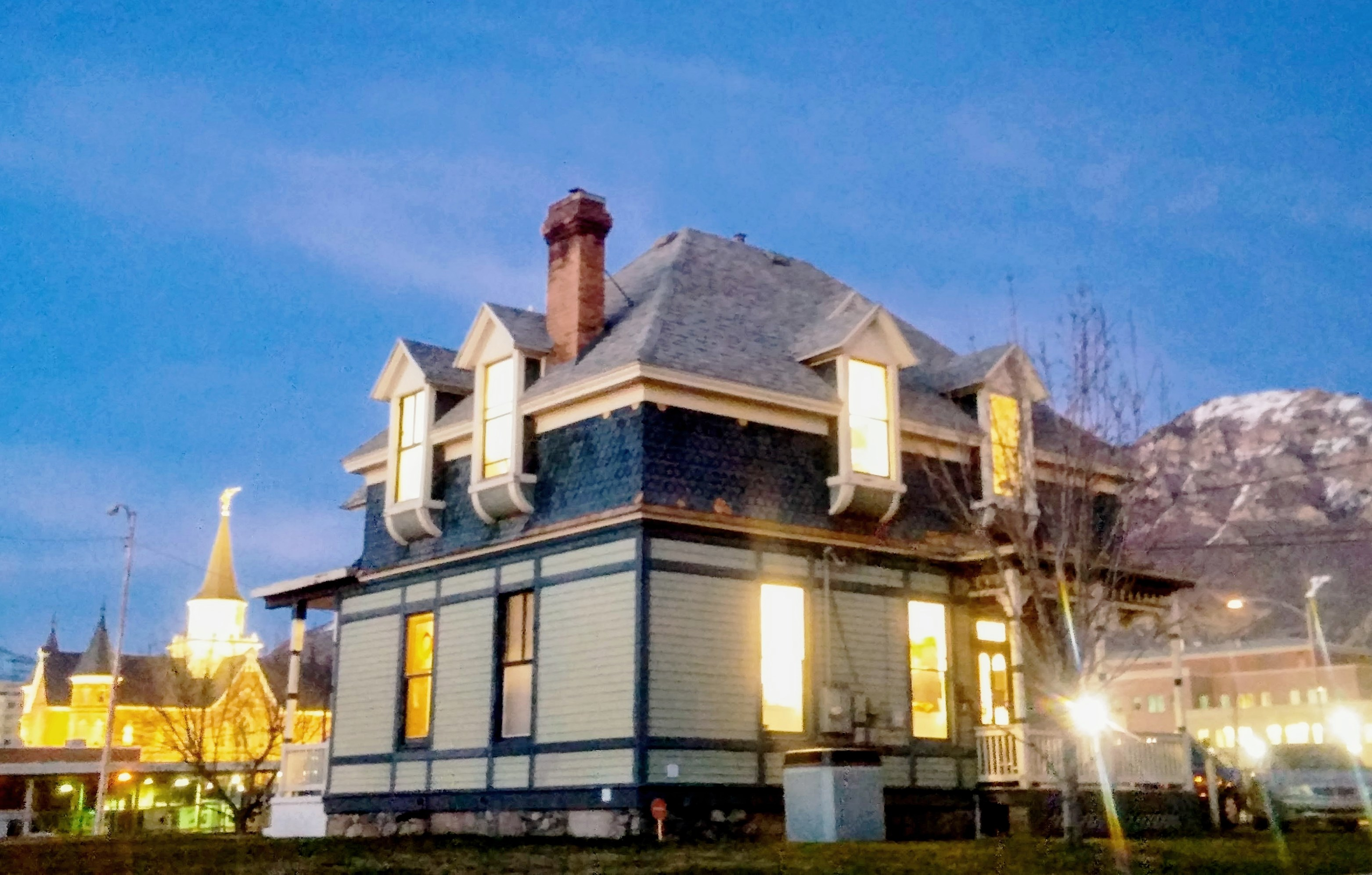
- Encircle House in Provo, Utah
- Formation: 2016; 10 years ago
- Founders: Stephenie Larsen
- Type: Nonprofit
- Headquarters: Provo, Utah
- Website: encircletogether.org

Encircle is a 501(c)(3) nonprofit organization that provides support and counselling for LGBTQ+ students and their families at multiple locations in Utah.

== History ==
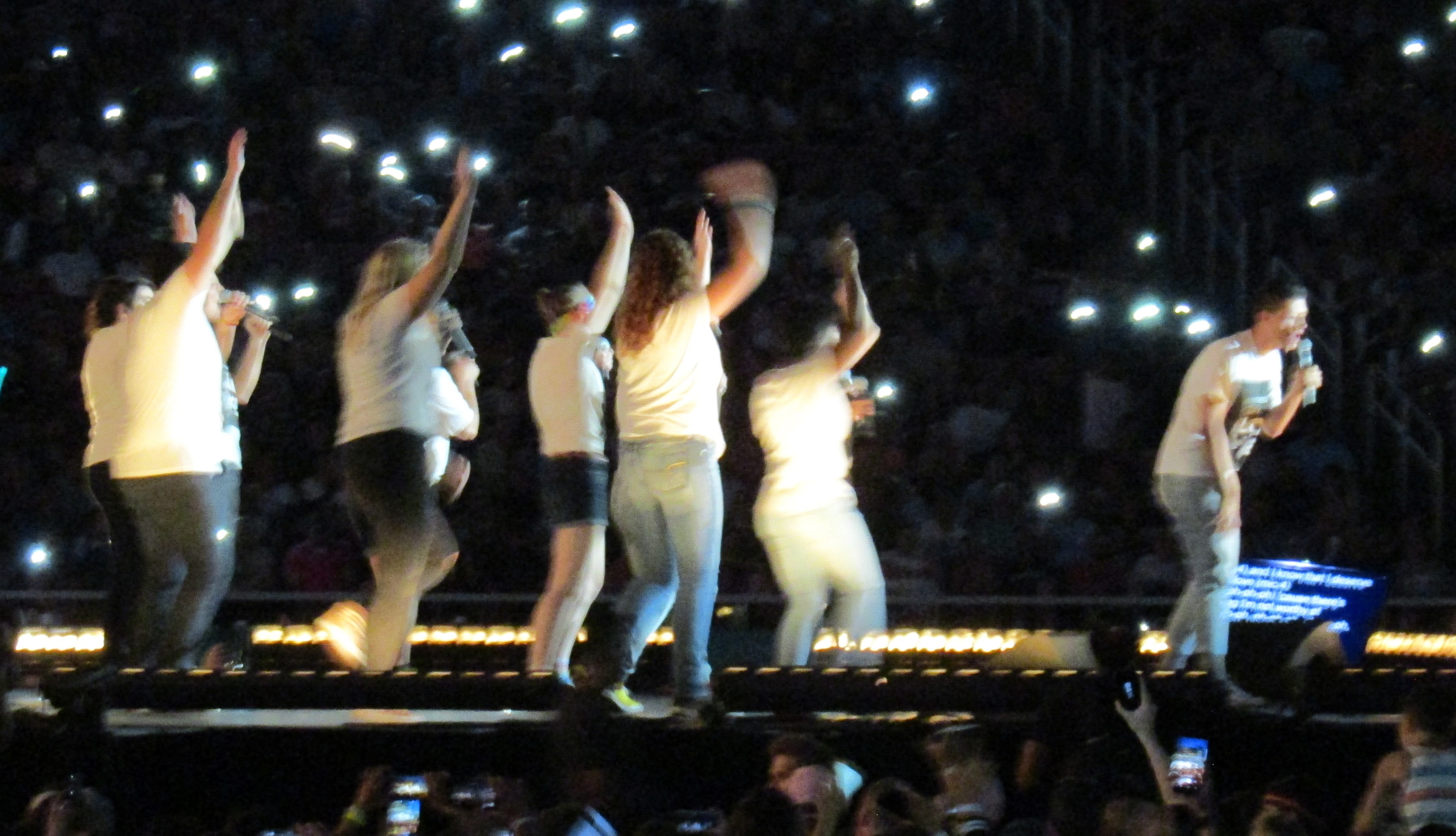
Members of Encircle performing at Loveloud 2018

Encircle was founded in 2016 by Stephenie Larsen. It was set up to help LGBTQ+ youth survive homophobia in the predominantly Mormon communities of Utah, and to help Mormons to become more accepting of LGBTQ+ people.

It opened to clients in Provo in February 2017, expanding to Salt Lake City in January 2018. In February 2019 it moved its Salt Lake City center to a larger site. It opened a location in St. George in October 2020, and as of January 2021 was readying a location in Heber. By June 2020, Encircle had more than 900 monthly clients.

Tyler Domgaard, the Program Manager of the Salt Lake City location, was arrested and charged in August 2020 for the possession of child pornography.

In February 2021, Tim Cook, Ryan Smith, and Dan Reynolds announced they were donating a combined US$4 million to Encircle to open new locations in Arizona, Idaho, Nevada, and Utah. By October 2021, an additional $5 million was raised for the same campaign through additional donors including many business, individuals, and The State of Utah. As of October 2021, the funds were being used to open nine new homes, a "Sustainability Fund" and Encircle Cafe.

=== Relationship with Flourish ===
In June 2019, Encircle cancelled its relationship with Flourish, a for-profit organization that had provided Encircle's therapy services. The change disrupted patient care, but Encircle said the change was necessary to protect Encircle's nonprofit status. Some patients left Encircle in order to continue seeing their existing therapists from Flourish, prompting Flourish to investigate converting to nonprofit status to make the therapy affordable.

== Support ==
Steve Young was one of the earliest donors and supporters of Encircle. He said, "Ensuring a safe, affirming place exists for LGBTQ+ young people to find friends, and for their parents to find support and guidance is vital - and Encircle is the organization to do just that.”

In October 2021, Utah State Governor Spencer Cox voiced his support, saying, "Many of Utah's LGBTQ youth face higher rates of depression, anxiety and social isolation, and that's why Encircle is so important. Finding a place for support, encouragement and belonging can make all the difference for LGBTQ youth and families, and Encircle provides that safe space. I'm proud to support Encircle as it serves thousands of Utah's most vulnerable youth."

=== Donors ===
The following organizations are listed as "Generous Community Supporters":

- Adobe
- Apple Giving
- AT&T Foundation
- BD.com
- BW Bastian Foundation
- Dancing Llama Foundation
- The Discover Brighter Futures Fund
- Dominion Energy Charitable Foundation
- E. Rhodes and Leona B. Carpenter Foundation
- Emergent Fund
- Enso Rings
- Eric Rea — Podium
- George S. and Dolores Doré Eccles Family Foundation
- Gold Key Realty, Inc.
- Greyson Chance
- Intermountain Healthcare
- Kahlert Foundation
- Kristin Chenoweth
- Kulynych Family Foundation
- Lawrence T. & Janet T. Dee Foundation
- Loveloud Foundation
- Making a Difference Foundation
- Marriott Daughters Foundation
- Northrop Grumman Foundation
- NuSkin
- The Richard K. and Shirley S. Hemingway Foundation
- Sam and Diane Stewart Family Foundation
- SelectHealth
- Utah County Cares
- Utah State Legislature
- UPS Foundation
- Walmart Giving
- WayOUT LGBTQ+ Foundation
- Weyerhaeuser Giving Fund
- Willard L. Eccles Charitable Foundation
- Young Living
- Zion's Bank
