= Equality Utah =

American non-profit organization for LGBT rights

- U.S. State of Utah
- Founded: 2001
- Type: Non-profit 501(c)(3)
- Location: Salt Lake City, Utah
- Region served: Utah
- Key people: Troy Williams (Executive Director)
- Website: equalityutah.org
- Formerly called: Unity Utah (2001–2004)

Equality Utah is an American non-profit 501(c)(3) organization which is Utah's largest LGBT rights group based in Salt Lake City, Utah. The organization is a member of the Equality Federation.

== History ==
Equality Utah was founded in 2001 as Unity Utah and took its present name in 2004.

In 2008, Equality Utah's Common Ground Initiative brought the group national attention. During the campaigns for and against California's 2008 Proposition 8, leaders of the Church of Jesus Christ of Latter-day Saints (LDS Church) made statements that the LDS Church "does not object to rights for same-sex couples regarding hospitalization and medical care, fair housing and employment rights, or probate rights." In response, on November 10, 2008, Equality Utah proposed a number of bills to the Utah State Legislature affording Utah citizens those rights and asked the LDS Church to "stand by" those statements. On December 23, 2008, Human Rights Campaign representatives delivered twenty-seven-thousand letters asking the LDS Church to support those bills; the LDS Church declined to comment on the matter.

In 2015, Equality Utah supported Utah State Bill 296, which amended the state's Antidiscrimination and Fair Housing Acts to ensure further protections against discrimination on the basis of sexual orientation or gender identity. The bill also provided certain exemptions aimed at protecting religious freedom. SB 296 was passed in March 2015 by a wide margin of votes in the state house and senate. The bill's success was attributed in large part to the official endorsement of the LDS Church. Following the senate's vote on the bill, Equality Utah Executive Director Troy Williams praised the bill's impact: "This is a stunning, historic day. I couldn't stop crying through it. This says that LGBT Utahns belong in this state. We belong here and we are being woven into the legal fabric of the state.”

In October 2016, Equality Utah and the National Center for Lesbian Rights filed a lawsuit against the Utah State Board of Education and three local school districts to contest a law prohibiting “advocacy of homosexuality” in schools. (This law and similar laws in other states are often called “No Promo Homo” laws.) The lawsuit was the first of its kind in the United States and was filed on behalf of three Utah students. The plaintiffs argued that the law limited free speech and created a hostile environment for LGBT students. The lawsuit was put on hold to allow the state legislature to consider a bill amending the “No Promo Homo” law, and in 2017, the state legislature passed Senate Bill 196, which removed the language prohibiting advocacy of homosexuality. The passage of Senate Bill 196 made Utah the second state to repeal a No Promo Homo law (the first being California). Equality Utah celebrated the change, saying it sent “a positive message that all students are valued in Utah.”

== Advocacy ==
Equality Utah is connected to two sister organizations: Equality Utah PAC (EUPAC) and Equality Utah Foundation. While Equality Utah focuses its efforts on legislation and lobbying, EUPAC dedicates its energy to endorsing and electing candidates who are supportive of the LGBTQ community. Equality Utah Foundation concentrates on educating people to participate in the political process.

In 2016 and 2017, Equality Utah partnered with Wellstone Action, a grassroots progressive advocacy organization, to train potential political candidates for the campaign trail.

As teen suicide has risen in the state of Utah, Equality Utah has focused its efforts on preventing such tragedies. In January 2018, Governor Gary Herbert announced the creation of the Teen Suicide Prevention Task Force. The coalition is made up of elected officials, suicide-prevention experts, and community leaders. Equality Utah is represented on the task force, which has been charged with finding solutions to reduce the number of teen suicides in Utah.

Equality Utah hosts a number of signature events to fundraise and support the local LGBTQ community. Their regular events include:

- Q Talks, a series of public speeches featuring short presentations on a variety of topics relevant to the LGBTQ community and its allies.
- Allies Dinner, an evening gala and fundraiser featuring a yearly theme and high-profile keynote speaker. Previous speakers include Robert Redford (2013), Laverne Cox (2014), Tyler Glenn (2015), Gloria Steinem (2016), and Chelsea Handler (2017).
- Equality Celebration, a family-friendly, themed event in held annually in southern Utah.
- PAC Brunch, a fundraising event for Equality Utah PAC featuring a noteworthy keynote speaker and bestowing the Champion of Equality award to someone who has made a positive difference in the political landscape for LGBTQ Utahns.

== See also ==
- LGBT rights in Utah
- Same-sex marriage in Utah
- List of LGBT rights organizations
