= David Nelson (Utah activist) =

American LGBTQ activist (1962–2024)

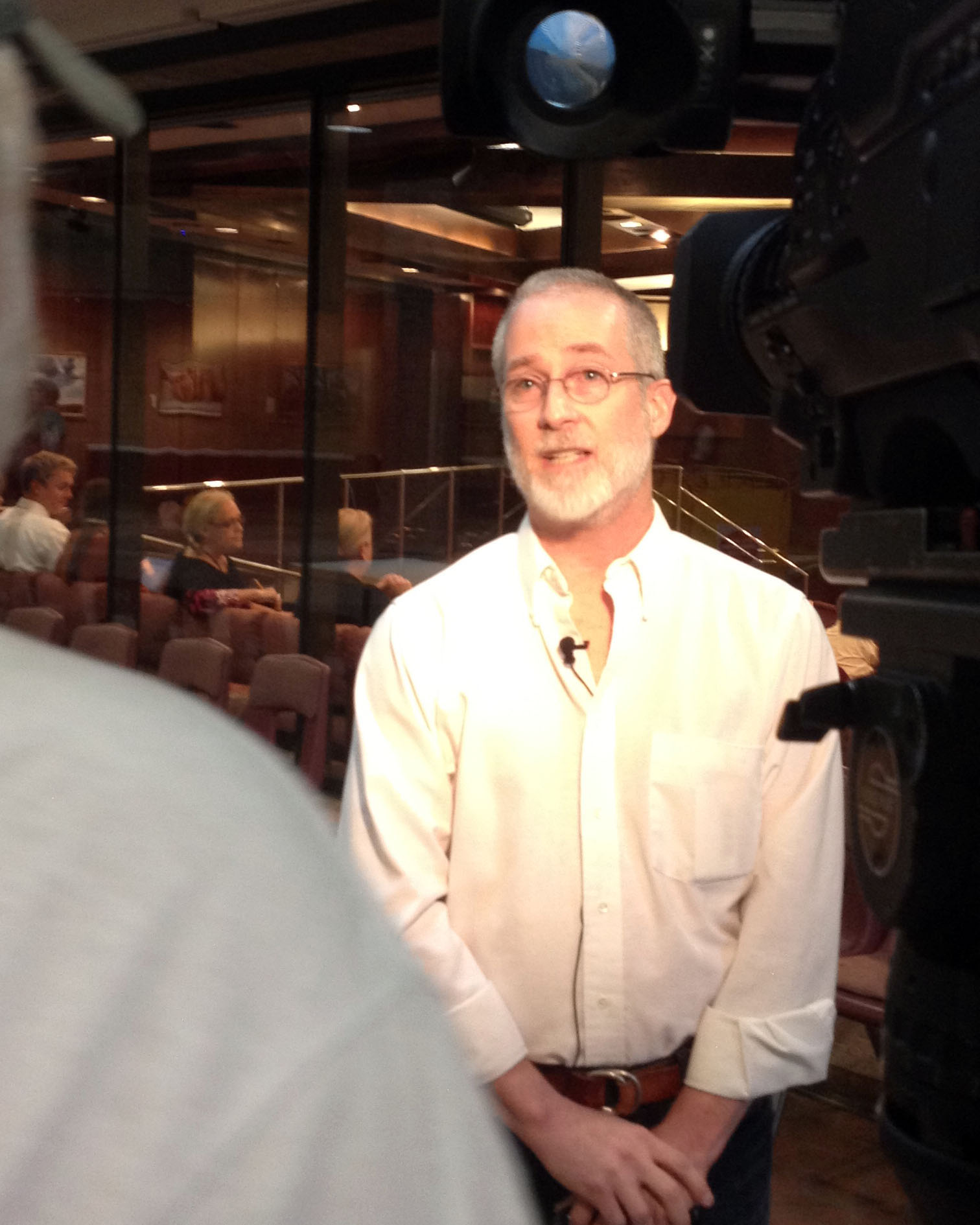
- Nelson speaking with a news reporter in 2012
- Born: David Keith Nelson; April 7, 1962; Salt Lake City, Utah, United States
- Died: June 11, 2024 (aged 62)
- Education: University of Utah
- Occupation: Activist
- Years active: 1982–2024
- Organization(s): Gay and Lesbian Utah Democrats, and later, Stonewall Shooting Sports of Utah
- Known for: LGBTQ community organizing, and political party- and public-policy lobbying
- Political party: Democratic
- Movement: Libertarian Democratic politics in the United States, LGBT rights in the United States and gun politics in the United States
- Relatives: Cannon family
- Awards: See Recognition

David Keith Nelson (April 7, 1962 – June 11, 2024) was an American LGBT and gun rights activist. He founded or helped found several LGBTQ-related nonprofit organizations in Utah and helped direct others. His work with the Democratic Party encouraged many LGBTQ Utahns to serve as party leaders. His work as a legislative and executive lobbyist accomplished the adoption of several LGBTQ- and weapon-friendly state and local laws, rules, ordinances and policies, and the rejection of other legislation.

== Personal ==
Nelson was born in Salt Lake City as a member of the political Cannon family. He studied political science at the University of Utah from 1982 to 1984. He retired in 2001 from his professional career in marketing and public relations, to reside in Brigham City, Utah. He lived with disabilities, and was diagnosed in 2015 with Autism Spectrum Disorder. After his diagnosis was established, he dedicated his abilities to LGBTQ autism advocacy, and helped create the LGBTQ-Autism Utah organization in 2018 with the Utah Pride Center, its Utah Pride Festival and the University of Utah Health Autism Spectrum Disorder Clinic.

Although not a Muslim, Nelson identified as a Sayyid based on self-conducted genealogical research as of 2021, worked to build ties between LGBTQ and MENA organizations.

Nelson died June 11, 2024, from Lewy body dementia.

== Activism career ==
Nelson became active in politics 1982. Though he was most active during the 1990s in Utah, he helped to direct political groups in California and the District of Columbia.

His work reflected the ideals of Jeffersonian democracy including American republicanism, civic duty and equality of political opportunity. His LGBTQ and Second Amendment politics pursued limited government which upholds the natural rights of the people and the rights of the states.

He earned the attention of governmental and political leaders, and news reporters.

Twenty years ago, David Nelson was one of the few Utah voices demanding basic rights for gay and lesbian citizens. Aggressive in promoting antidiscrimination measures, he assisted in passage of the first hate-crimes legislation. Although Nelson frequently generated disagreement among supporters (including me), no one can dispute the courage he exhibited in the early years of this movement.
—Frank R. Pignanelli and LaVarr Webb, "Political pioneers, then and now, deserve thanks," Deseret Morning News, July 30, 2006

While the fight for gay marriage has hatched a whole new generation of gay rights activists, some Utahns have had their shoulder to the wheel of equality for decades. One of the most notable, Dave Nelson, is a pioneer of queer politics in the state who has carved a niche for himself in Utah politics for being a fierce advocate of his community since the early '80s while also fighting for the rights of gun owners.
—Eric S. Peterson, "Dave Nelson on the queer New Year," Salt Lake City Weekly, December 30, 2009

=== Nonpartisan work ===
As a political leader, Nelson founded or helped found several LGBTQ-related nonpartisan political groups in Utah and helped direct others. His work as a public-policy lobbyist accomplished the adoption of several LGBTQ- and weapon-friendly state and local laws, rules, ordinances and policies, and the rejection of other legislation.

==== Organization ====
Nelson founded the Military Law Task Force of Salt Lake City in 1982, and served as an administrative-law attorney from 1982 to 1983 for active-duty and veteran servicemembers.

He served from 1983 to 1984 as a vice president of the Lesbian and Gay Student Union at the University of Utah. He served in 2002 as a member of the board of advisers of the University of Utah Lesbian Gay Bisexual Transgender Resource Center and as the co-chairman of its public-relations committee.

He helped found Gay Community Inc. in 1985, and served as a co-publisher of its Community Reporter newspaper. He served from 1986 to 1987 as a co-publisher of the Triangle Magazine news magazine, in 2004 as the sports editor of the Salt Lake Metro newspaper and in 2006 as a columnist of the QSaltLake newspaper.

He interviewed The Times of Harvey Milk gay filmmaker Rob Epstein and Before Stonewall lesbian filmmaker Greta Schiller in 1985 at the Sundance Film Festival. The interview was broadcast by KRCL Radio, and excerpts were published by the Community Reporter newspaper. He was a technical staffer for the Sundance Institute from 1983 to 1985 and for the festival from 1984 to 1986.

He helped found the Gay and Lesbian Community Council of Utah in 1986.

He served from 1986 to 1988 as the Utah field associate of the Washington-based Fairness Fund. The group was acquired in 1988 by the Washington-based Human Rights Campaign Fund Inc. (HRCF) as its field division. He served from 1987 to 1988 and from 1989 to 1991 as the HRCF Utah field director.

He organized LGBTQ Utahns from 1986 to 1987 and from 1990 to 1997 to attend the annual Utah Days of Remembrance of the Victims of the Holocaust commemoration at the Utah Capitol rotunda. He produced and helped distribute fliers and replica pink triangle and black triangle concentration-camp badges to commemoration patrons.

He served from 1988 to 1989 as a member of the board of advisers of the San Jose, Calif.-based Bay Area Municipal Elections Committee.

He served from 1991 to 1997 as a guest public speaker at collegiate, community and LGBTQ groups in Utah including the University of Utah Hinckley Institute of Politics, Weber State University and the YWCA of Salt Lake City.

He organized the lobbying of the members of the U.S. congressional delegation from Utah in 1993 by their constituents at the March on Washington for Lesbian, Gay and Bi Equal Rights and Liberation.

He helped organize a protest of, and published a complaint to the Utah Judicial Conduct Commission against, Utah 3rd District Court Judge David S. Young in 1994 for reducing the sentence of David Nelson Thacker who was convicted of killing gay Salt Lake City businessman Douglas Koehler. He helped organize the "No on Young" campaign in 1996 against the retention election of Young who lost election in 2002—the first judge who lost election in the state.

He served in 1997 as a member of the board of directors of the Washington-based Gay and Lesbian Victory Fund Inc. and as the chairman of its public-relations committee.

He helped organize a memorial service and candlelight vigil in 1998 in Utah after the beating death of gay University of Wyoming student Matthew Shepard.

He helped develop in 1998 a legal and political strategy for the repeal of the state sodomy law with the American Civil Liberties Union of Utah.

He founded GayVoteUtah.com in 2001 to offer the online voter registration of LGBTQ Utahns.

He founded Stonewall Shooting Sports of Utah in 2002 which became one of the largest LGBTQ firearm groups in the United States—the first such group in the state.

He founded the Utah Stonewall Hall of Fame in 2006 with more than 600 LGBTQ Utahns inducted.

==== Governance ====
Nelson campaigned unsuccessfully in 1985 as an openly gay candidate for election to serve as a member of the Salt Lake City Council—the first such campaign in the city. He placed third among four primary-election candidates when his campaign received 320 (9 percent) of the votes cast.

He served from 1994 to 1995 as an openly gay member of a federal Social Services Block Grant allocation panel for the Salt Lake County Human Services Advisory Council.

He received nominations from 11 Utah elected public officials and citizens in 1995 for appointment to serve as an openly gay member of the advisory board of the Salt Lake Organizing Committee for the Olympic and Paralympic Winter Games of 2002.

He served from 1997 to 2001 as an openly gay member of the Hate Crimes Working Group for the U.S. Department of Justice Office of the Attorney for the District of Utah, and helped produce the "Changing Face of Hate: A National Symposium" conference in 1999 that was sponsored by the U.S. Attorney for the District of Utah, the Los Angeles-based Simon Wiesenthal Center, Weber State University and the Utah Task Force on Racial and Ethnic Fairness in the Legal System.

==== Opportunity ====
Nelson lobbied unsuccessfully in 1993 for the repeal of a Salt Lake Tribune policy which prohibited the publication of same-sex personal advertisements.

==== Policy ====
Nelson wrote and lobbied unsuccessfully from 1986 to 1987 for the adoption of a Salt Lake City Council bill which would have created a city human-rights commission and prohibited discrimination including that based on sexual orientation—the first such proposal in Utah.

He lobbied successfully from 1986 to 1987 for the adoption of a Salt Lake City Police Department policy which requires LGBTQ sensitivity training for department officers—the first such policy in Utah.

He lobbied successfully in 1990 against the Utah State Office of Education recommendation that the local exhibitors of The World of Anne Frank redact educational information about the homosexual victims of the Holocaust. He produced and helped distribute fliers and replica pink triangle concentration-camp badges to exhibit-premiere patrons.

He helped write and lobbied successfully in 1991 and 1992 for the adoption of two Utah Legislature bills which prohibit and study hate crimes—the first such laws in the state. He lobbied unsuccessfully from 1992 to 1999 for the adoption of various bills which would have improved the laws.

He wrote and lobbied successfully in 1992 for the adoption of a Salt Lake County Board of Commissioners bill which prohibits discrimination in county-government employment and services including that based on sexual orientation—the first such law in Utah. He lobbied successfully in 1995 against the repeal of the law's "marital status" and "sexual orientation" protections. Leaders of the county Gay and Lesbian Employee Association were critical of him and others who opposed the repeal, and said that he "did not speak for GLEA."

He lobbied unsuccessfully in 1992 against the appointment of controversial former Phoenix Police Chief Ruben Ortega to serve as the chief of the Salt Lake City Police Department.

He lobbied unsuccessfully from 1992 to 1993 for the adoption of a Utah State Textbook Commission administrative rule which would have allowed public schools to use textbooks which included information about homosexuality.

He helped write and lobbied successfully in 1993 for the adoption of a Utah Legislature bill which provides for viatical settlements which allow individuals who are terminally ill to sell their life-insurance policies before death to pay health-care expenses, and to improve their quality of life.

He lobbied successfully in 1993 and 1994 against the adoption of two Utah Legislature bills which would have required HIV testing of individuals who significantly exposed other individuals including public-safety officers or emergency-medical service providers to HIV during the performance of their duties. The bills didn't protect medical privacy. He lobbied successfully in 1995 for the amendment of a similar bill to protect such privacy, and the bill was adopted.

He served from 1993 to 2003 as a licensed Utah legislative and executive lobbyist for LGBTQ public-policy development.

He lobbied successfully in 1994 for the amendment of a Utah Legislature bill which would have required DNA profiling of individuals convicted of violating certain state laws including the state sodomy law. The amendment removed the profiling of individuals convicted of violating the sodomy law, and the bill was adopted.

He lobbied unsuccessfully in 1995 against the adoption of a Utah Legislature bill which prohibits the recognition of same-sex marriages. He was later sentenced by a Midvale Justice Court judge to pay a $50 fine and to serve a suspended six-day jail term for committing an act of civil disobedience in protest of the law. He lobbied unsuccessfully in 1996 against the adoption of a Utah Legislature bill which restricted LGBT-student clubs at public schools.

He lobbied successfully in 1998 against the adoption of a Utah Office of the Attorney General amicus curiae brief which would have opposed same-sex marriage in the Vermont Supreme Court case of Baker v. State of Vermont, No. 98-032 (Vt. 1999).

He lobbied unsuccessfully in 2007 for a Utah Legislature bill which would have amended the state sodomy law by removing the provisions that the U.S. Supreme Court determined in 2003 to be unconstitutional in its opinion about Lawrence v. Texas, 539 U.S. 558 (2003). The bill wasn't considered.

He lobbied successfully in 2007 to amend a Utah Legislature bill which would have prohibited the possession of a concealed firearm at state institutions of higher education, and allows a dormitory resident to request only roommates who aren't permitted to carry concealed firearms. The amendment removed the prohibition, and the bill was adopted.

He lobbied successfully in 2007 for the repeal of a Salt Lake County facility-management policy which prohibited the possession of a weapon at two county convention centers, and required facility lessees to extend the restriction to their guests. The Utah Pride Center had extended the restriction to the guests of its annual LGBTQ-student Queer Prom which was produced at the Salt Palace Convention Center.

He lobbied successfully in 2007 to amend a Utah Pride Festival policy which prohibited the possession of all weapons at the festival events. The amendment removed the prohibition of legal weapons. He was nonetheless detained, questioned and removed from the festival by a Salt Lake City Police Department officer after festival workers complained about his lawful possession of an unconcealed firearm. He filed a complaint and a $25,000 claim against Salt Lake City Corp., and received an apology from the police chief.

He lobbied successfully in 2010 for the repeal of a Utah Bureau of Criminal Identification administrative rule which restricted the issuance of the state concealed-firearm permit to individuals who were ever convicted of violating the state sodomy law. He lobbied unsuccessfully from 2010 to 2012 for the repeal of Utah Division of Occupational and Professional Licensing administrative rules which restrict the issuance of licenses to individuals who were ever convicted of violating the state sodomy law.

=== Partisan work ===
As a libertarian Democrat and party leader, Nelson founded or helped found several LGBTQ-related Democratic Party groups in Utah and helped direct others. His work as a party-policy lobbyist accomplished the adoption of several LGBTQ-friendly national-, state- and local-party policies, and the rejection of other policies.

==== Organization ====
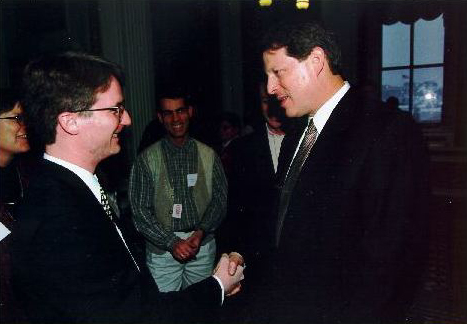
David Nelson at a meeting with U.S. Vice President Al Gore in Washington in 1996

Nelson founded Gay and Lesbian Utah Democrats in 1990 to affiliate with the Utah Democratic Party—the first such group in the state. The group combined the work of a party caucus, a fund-raising political-action committee and a lobbying group. At its first state-party convention in 1990, the group was called "a new political powerhouse" by KUTV Television news reporters, and became one of the largest caucuses in the party. The group stopped its fund-raising and lobbying work in 1997, but remained a caucus. He retired in 2001 from the group leadership, and the group was renamed as Utah Stonewall Democrats.

He created an online national network of LGBTQ groups and individuals in 1995 to re-establish the communication between them that existed with the former Washington-based National Association of Gay and Lesbian Democratic Clubs from 1982 to 1987. He helped found the Washington-based National Stonewall Democratic Federation in 1996 to affiliate with the Democratic National Committee. U.S. Rep. Barney Frank of Massachusetts developed the federation further when he encouraged it in 1998 to incorporate as the Washington-based National Stonewall Democrats. The group was incorporated in 1999.

He organized gay Utahns in 1996 to attend a meeting of LGBTQ Democrats with U.S. Vice President Al Gore at the Indian Treaty Room of the Old Executive Office Building in Washington.

He helped staff a National Rifle Association of America exhibit in 2005 at the Utah Democratic Convention.

==== Administration ====
Nelson served in 1991 as a member of the Democratic National Committee security staff for presidential candidates including Gov. Bill Clinton of Arkansas at a committee meeting in Los Angeles.

He served from 1992 to 1995 as a member of the Salt Lake County Democratic Party Constitutional Committee.

He campaigned unsuccessfully in 1993 as an openly gay candidate for election to serve as the secretary of the Utah Democratic Party—the first such campaign of a major party in the state. He placed second among two party-election candidates when his campaign received 229 (37 percent) of the votes cast.

He campaigned successfully in 1996 for Utah Democratic Party election to serve as an openly gay delegate to the Democratic National Convention in Chicago and as the Utah LGBT-outreach director for the Clinton-Gore presidential campaign. He campaigned successfully in 2000 for Utah Democratic Party election to serve as an openly gay delegate to the Democratic National Convention in Los Angeles and as the Utah LGBT-outreach director for the Gore-Lieberman presidential campaign.

He served from 2003 to 2004 as an openly gay Utah coordinator for the Wesley Clark presidential campaign.

==== Policy ====
Nelson lobbied unsuccessfully in 1986 for the inclusion of LGBTQ speakers at a Democratic National Committee Policy Commission meeting in Salt Lake City by commission co-chairman and former Utah Gov. Scott M. Matheson Sr.

He lobbied successfully in 1993 for the appointment of openly gay Utahns to serve as members of the Utah Democratic Party standing committees—the first such appointments by a major party in the state. He served from 1993 to 1997 as the chairman of the party Membership and Credentials Standing Committee, and as a member of the party Platform and Policy Standing Committee.

He lobbied unsuccessfully in 1995 for the adoption of a Utah Democratic Party censure of Utah House of Representatives Democratic Whip Rep. Kelly C. Atkinson after he described LGBTQ Democrats as a party "fringe" group in an op-ed commentary which was published by the Deseret News newspaper. Atkinson said later that he regretted his use of the description. The attempted censure was a reason legislative Democrats and party leaders were critical of Nelson, and asked Gay and Lesbian Utah Democrats leaders unsuccessfully in 1996 to stop describing the group as Democratic. Nelson and other group leaders refused the request.

He wrote, sponsored and lobbied successfully in 1995 for the adoption of a Utah Democratic Party resolution which supported the adoption of the federal Employment Non-Discrimination Act.

He lobbied unsuccessfully in 1996 against a campaign promise by Democratic candidate for the U.S. House of Representatives Ross C. "Rocky" Anderson to oppose same-sex marriage and "vote my constituents' wishes" if he were elected to the Congress despite supporting equal marriage rights. Anderson was critical of Nelson and others who opposed Anderson's change of opinion, and said that he couldn't "believe some of them were hiding in waiting to take pot shots at me now."

=== Recognition ===
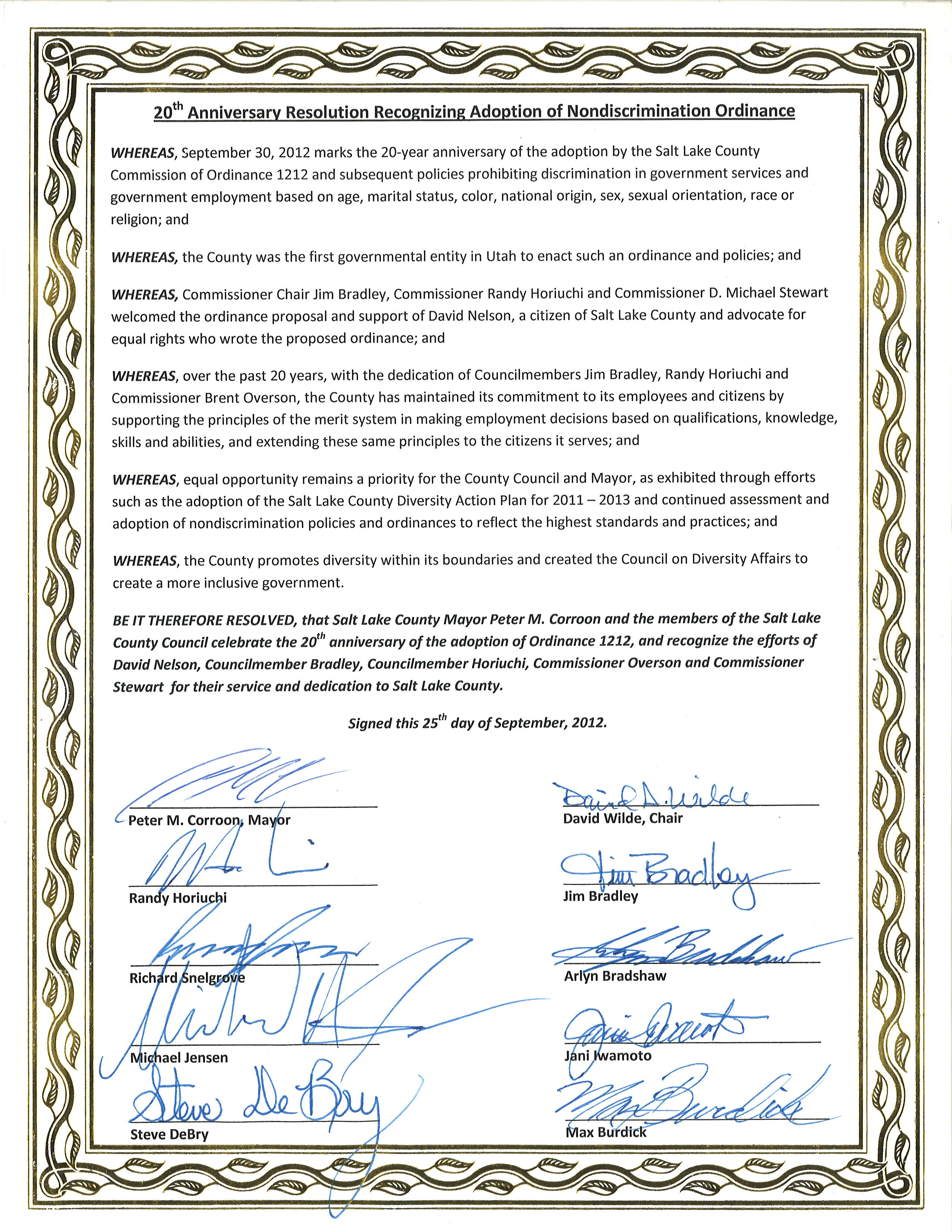
Salt Lake County joint commemorative resolution presented to David Nelson in 2012

For his work in politics, Nelson:

- Received in 1990 a Gay and Lesbian Utah Democrats Founder's Award.
- Received in 1993 a Utah Stonewall Center Diversity Is Great! Award.
- Received in 1998 a Democratic National Committee Lawrence O'Brien Award—the first such award presented to a Utahn.
- Received in 1999 a U.S. Department of Justice Office of the Attorney for the District of Utah certificate of appreciation.
- Received in 2006 a Deseret Morning News "Pignanelli & Webb" encomium.
- Received in 2008 a Salt Lake City Weekly "Best of Utah 2008: Best 'Cold dead hands'" award and encomium.
- Received in 2012 a Salt Lake County Mayor and Council joint commemorative resolution—the first such resolution presented to a gay Utahn.

== See also ==
- Cannon family
- LGBT rights in Utah
- Libertarian Democrat
- List of LGBT rights activists
- Stonewall Shooting Sports of Utah
- Utah
