= O'Brien Trophy =

O'Brien Trophy or O'Brien Award may refer to:

- O'Brien Trophy (ice hockey) or O'Brien Cup, a retired trophy that was awarded in the National Hockey Association and the National Hockey League from 1910 to 1950
- Larry O'Brien Championship Trophy, awarded annually to the National Basketball Association (NBA) Finals winner.
- Davey O'Brien Award, presented annually to the collegiate American football player adjudged to be the best of all National Collegiate Athletic Association quarterbacks.
- Lawrence O'Brien Award, presented to individuals and groups who exhibit a high degree of commitment and self-sacrifice on behalf of the U.S. Democratic Party.
