= Stonewall Democrats Utah =

LGBT political group

Stonewall Democrats Utah logo

Utah Stonewall Democrats is a Salt Lake City-based lesbian, gay, bisexual and transgender (LGBTQ) political group affiliated with the Utah Democratic Party. The word "Stonewall" in the group's name refers to the Stonewall riots of 1969, a pivotal event in the history of protecting equal rights for LGBT people.

== History ==
The group was founded in 1990 by Utah LGBT activist David Nelson. The group was named Gay and Lesbian Utah Democrats from 1990 to 1997 and Utah Democratic Gay and Lesbian Caucus from 1997 to 2002. It has been named Utah Stonewall Democrats since 2002.

=== Gay and Lesbian Utah Democrats ===
The group combined the work of a political party caucus, a fund-raising political-action committee and a lobbying group. At its first state-party convention in 1990, the group was called "a new political powerhouse" by KUTV Television news reporters, and became one of the largest caucuses in the party. The group's executive director from 1990 to 1994 was Dale Sorenson. The group's executive committee chairman from 1990 to 1997 was Michael Aaron. The group served from 1996 to 1997 as a National Stonewall Democratic Federation affiliate. The group accomplished the adoption of several LGBT-friendly state and local laws, ordinances, rules and policies, and several party policies. The group stopped its fund-raising and lobbying work in 1997, but remained a caucus, and was renamed as the Utah Democratic Gay and Lesbian Caucus.

=== Utah Democratic Gay and Lesbian Caucus ===
The group continued the work of a party caucus. The group's executive-committee chairman from 1997 to 2001 was David Thometz. The group's executive-committee chairman from 2001 to 2002 was Michael Picardi. The group served from 1997 to 1999 as a National Stonewall Democratic Federation affiliate and since 1999 as a National Stonewall Democrats affiliate. Nelson retired in 2001 from the group leadership, and the group was renamed in 2002 as Utah Stonewall Democrats.

=== Utah Stonewall Democrats ===
The group continued the work of a party caucus. The group's executive-committee chairman from 2002 to 2007 was Michael Picardi. The group's executive-committee chairwoman from 2007 to 2011 was Nikki Boyer. The group's executive-committee chairman from 2011 to 2015 was Todd Bennett. The group's executive-committee chairwoman from 2015 to 2021 was Becky Moss. Under Becky Moss, the group reclaimed its status as a PAC in 2016. The group's executive-committee chairwoman from 2021 to 2025 was Jen Schwarz. Sophia Hawes-Tingey has been executive-committee chairwoman since January 2025. The group has served since 2001 as a National Stonewall Democrats affiliate.

== See also ==
- Democratic Party
- LGBT rights in Utah
- Utah Democratic Party
