= Pink Pistols =

Gay gun rights organization in the United States and Canada

- Founded: July 2000; 26 years ago
- Type: Gun rights, LGBTQ rights
- Location: United States, Canada
- Website: pinkpistols.org

The Pink Pistols is an LGBTQ gun rights organization in the United States and Canada. Their motto is "Pick on someone your own caliber".

== History ==
Inspired by a Salon.com article by Jonathan Rauch, Krikket (aka Doug Krick), a libertarian activist from Illinois living in Massachusetts, founded the Pink Pistols in July 2000. The organization had at least 45 chapters as of October 2014. Those chapters are located in 33 states and three countries that are principally made up of gun-owning LGBTQ individuals, though neither status is mandatory for membership.

The political orientation of the Pink Pistols is considered unusual due to the popular perception in the United States of firearms ownership as a conservative issue and sexuality as a liberal issue.

Pink Pistols' activities include firing range visits and political activism. The group occasionally produces report cards on politicians, rating their position on issues of interest to members. According to pinkpistols.org:

The Pink Pistols get together at least once a month at local firing ranges to practice shooting and to acquaint people new to firearms with them. We will help you select a firearm, acquire a permit, and receive proper training in its safe and legal use for self-defense. The more people know that members of our community may be armed, the less likely they will be to single us out for attack.

The Pink Pistols' symbol consists of an overhead view of a picto-person aiming a handgun in an isosceles stance superimposed on a pink triangle. The pink triangle, now a gay pride and gay rights symbol, was originally a badge that homosexual concentration camp victims were forced to wear during the Holocaust.

According to spokesperson Gwen Patton, "We don't want people to hurt us, we want people to run away from us, and the best way we have found to do that is to be armed." Patton has also stated that, "the Pink Pistols tend to get a better response from firearms supporters than from homosexuals".

The group's membership increased from 1,500 to 4,500 in the week after the 2016 Orlando nightclub shooting. As of June 24, 2016, the membership is over 7,000, and 36 chapters around the country. The group experienced a further rise in interest following Donald Trump's presidential election later that year. By April 2017, the group claimed a membership of over 9,000.

On September 23, 2018, trans woman Erin Palette became the new president of the Pink Pistols.

On October 19, 2018, Pink Pistols founder Doug "Krikket" Krick died due to suicide.

In January 2020, the winner of Season 4 of the History Channel show Top Shot, Chris Cheng (the first openly gay man to win the contest), joined the Board of Directors of Operation Blazing Sword/Pink Pistols (two-gun rights-LGBTQ organizations that merged in 2018).

== See also ==
- The Pink Panthers
- Stonewall Shooting Sports of Utah
- List of LGBT-related organizations
