= Stonewall Shooting Sports of Utah =

Utah gun rights advocacy group

Stonewall Shooting Sports of Utah is a group of gun rights advocates in Utah. It supports the Pink Pistols’ idea that was described nationally in 2000 by writer Jonathan Rauch for the legal, responsible and safe use of weapons for their self defense, recreation and shooting sports. Hundreds of supporters including those who are lesbian, gay, bisexual and transgender (LGBT) have joined the group since 2002 when it was founded by Utah gay activist David Nelson.

== Politics ==
The group is nonpartisan, but recognizes that most LGBT Americans identify as Democrats. The group promotes the Second Amendment Foundation and more than 50 other self-defense groups including African American Hunting Association LLC, Amendment II Democrats, American Gun Culture Report, Armed Liberals, Gun Loving Liberal, The Gun Toting Liberal, Gun Toting Liberals, GunTards.net, The Liberal Gun Club, Liberals With Guns, Oregon Democratic Gun Owners Caucus, Pro-Gun Progressive and Women Against Gun Control.

== Government ==
Members of the group are encouraged to campaign for candidates and lobby for public policies which support their interest in the Second Amendment to the Constitution for the United States and the protection of equal rights for gay Americans, and against the fear of weapons. They worked successfully for state legislation which protects the right of students to possess legally concealed firearms on public college campuses, to eliminate gun-free policies at Salt Lake City- and Salt Lake County-government public property, and continue to work against hate crime.

== See also ==
- Athlete Ally
- Gun politics in the United States
- LGBT rights in the United States
- Pink Pistols
