= Stonewall Young Democrats =

American political organization

Stonewall Democrats
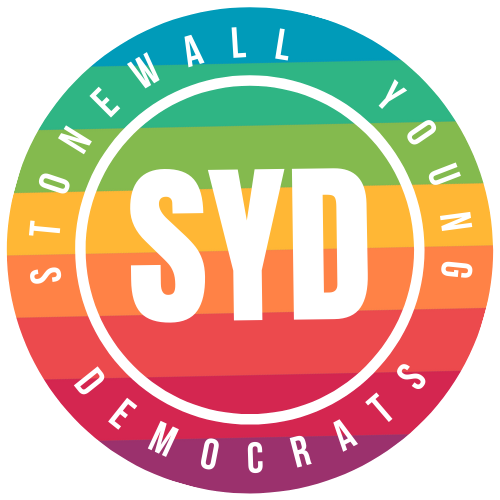
- Named after: Stonewall Inn / Stonewall riots Democratic Party
- Formation: 2004; 22 years ago
- Type: LGBT political organization
- Legal status: Active
- Location: Los Angeles, California
- Website: Stonewall Young Democrats homepage

The Stonewall Young Democrats (SYD) are youth-based organization across the country which are part of the LGBT-rights group in the United States, affiliated with the Stonewall Democrats and the Democratic Party.

== San Diego chapter ==
Stonewall Young Democrats of San Diego (SYDSD) was founded in 2005 by Jonathan Goetz, Chrissy Walter (now Chrissy Fectau) and Elyse Ganzer (now Elyse Montano). Under its initial inception, SYDSD was started as the youth branch of the San Diego Democratic Club.

It eventually chartered as its own independent organization under the California Young Democrats (CYD) umbrella with the leadership of then Regional Director Allan Acevedo, who was subsequently elected SYDSD President.

After marriage equality became the law of the land Livengood moved to Puerto Rico and the San Diego Chapter ceased operation. Its website domain name URL was assumed by Equally American, which "fights to advance equality and civil rights for the 3.5 million citizens living in U.S. territories- 98% of whom are people of color."

Many members continued staying involved in either San Diego Democrats for Equality (SDDE) and/or San Diego County Young Democrats (SDCYD), including Ryan Darsey, who as of 2022 still serves as SDDE Vice-President for Resource Development.

== Dallas chapter ==
The Dallas Stonewall Young Democrats (DSYD) held its first meeting on July 6, 2006, in Dallas, Texas. The first officers were Paul Tran, Siobhan Bailey, Alex Ortega, and Brandon Kneefel. The group stopped meeting in 2008 and reformed in March 2009.

=== The Red Party ===
The original organizers of the group were all volunteers at Legacy Founders Cottage, an AIDS hospice in Oak Cliff, where they built a friendship based on community service and activism. Since its inception, DSYD has maintained a close relationship with the Legacy Founders Cottage and continues to provide support in the form of volunteer hours and by hosting benefit fundraisers.

== Membership ==
Membership to Stonewall Young Democrats is open to lesbian, gay, bisexual, transgender, and intersex (LGBTI) individuals and straight cisgender allies who are under the age of 36, as to comply with the California Young Democrats requirement all its Young Democrats groups that charter with them.

- Any persons under 36 can either become at-large members or active members:
  - Active membership: Individuals who are of qualifying age and who have paid may vote at any general membership meeting, run for any of the elected offices, participate in committees, and represent SYD in Democratic events. An individual must be a member of good standing for a period of at least twenty-five (25) days before voting in a meeting.
  - At-large membership: Any person meeting age and Democratic registration requirements who wishes to be a member without paying dues shall be granted At-large membership. At-large members receive all privileges except the privileges of voting, filing and running for SYD office, representing Stonewall Young Democrats at any Democratic event, automatic membership into Stonewall Democratic Club or any other affiliated organization.
