= Lawrence O'Brien Award =

The Democratic National Committee (DNC) Lawrence O'Brien Award was created in 1992 by the family of Lawrence Francis "Larry" O'Brien Jr. (1917–1990) and Democratic Party leaders to recognize the many years of service he gave to the party and his belief in the contribution of party volunteers. Since then, party leaders presented this award on five occasions to 94 winners from across the United States.

The award honors the importance of this contribution to the continuing success and vitality of the party. It's given to individuals and groups who exhibit a high degree of commitment and self-sacrifice on behalf of the party and its candidates.

The award was expanded in 1998 to help mark the 150th anniversary of the DNC. Party leaders honored an individual or group from every commonwealth, district, state and territory and six individuals nationally. Through the generosity of the O'Brien family, award winners also received financial grants.

A news report which was published in 2000 by Insight magazine described a 1998 controversy about e-mail messages which were written between the Clinton administration staff members and 1996 presidential reelection campaign staffers about political fundraising by administration staffers. Some of the messages were written in 1996 and solicited the award for a campaign contributor.

== Selection ==
Award winners are selected from among many nominations received from party leaders, appointed and elected public officials, and other Democrats in the United States. Each winner worked at the local-, state- or national-party levels, including assisting candidates for elected public office. Furthermore, the winners made personal, family or financial sacrifices, or otherwise showed unusual or extraordinary dedication to the furtherance of the goals of the party, without financial remuneration or professional gain.

== Winners ==
- Miguel A. Hernández Agosto, Territory of Puerto Rico, 1998
- Pongsun Choi "Sunny" Allen, State of Ohio, 1995
- Patsy B. Arceneaux, State of Louisiana, 1998
- Pat Banditch, State of Colorado, 1998
- Rachel "Rae" Barone, State of New York, 1998
- Bettina Basanow, State of Colorado, 1993
- John Beemer, Commonwealth of Pennsylvania, 1998
- Mitchell Berger, State of Florida, 1994
- Milton Bronstein, State of Rhode Island, 1998
- Raymond Buckley, State of New Hampshire, 1998
- Lucy Madden Buntain, State of Nebraska, 1998
- Virginia H. Cain, State of Nevada, 1998
- Sara Caldwell, State of Tennessee, 1994
- Ellen Callanan, Commonwealth of Massachusetts, 1998
- Billie Carr, State of Texas, 1998
- Bethine Church, State of Idaho, 1998
- College Democrats of America, District of Columbia, 1993
- Laura Comini, State of Oregon, 1998
- Carolyn H. Covington, State of Alaska, 1998
- Joseph F. Crangle, State of New York, 1992
- Al Davidson, Democrats Abroad, 1998
- Felisa Rincón de Gautier, Territory of Puerto Rico, 1992
- Harold Demarest Jr., State of Oregon, 1995
- Nancy Dick, State of Florida, 1998
- Abbi Easter, Commonwealth of Virginia, 1998
- Ed Fibiger, State of North Dakota, 1998
- Irene Findlater, Commonwealth of Massachusetts, 1993
- C. Pat Frank, State of Oklahoma, 1998
- Anita Freedman, State of New Hampshire, 1994
- Lutu Tenari Fuimaono, Territory of American Samoa, 1998
- James "Jim" Gallagher, State of Oklahoma, 1998
- George Gaukler, State of North Dakota, 1995
- Eugenia Gil, State of Connecticut, 1998
- Diane Glasser, State of Florida, 1994
- Kevin Gover, State of New Mexico, 1993
- Susan Gwinn, State of Ohio, 1998
- Laurence Hansen, State of Minnesota, 1995
- Marsha Harbaugh, State of Wyoming, 1998
- Nettie Harrelson, State of New Mexico, 1995
- William "Bill" Hegarty, State of Arizona, 1998
- Rosa Holliday, State of Michigan, 1998
- Billie Houck, State of Iowa, 1998
- Anthony Hyde, Democrats Abroad, 1998
- Kathy Jamison, State of Delaware, 1998
- Harold Jinks, State of Arkansas, 1992
- Alan Karcher, State of New Jersey, 1998
- Richard Kennedy, State of New Mexico, 1998
- Donna Kilpatrick, State of Montana, 1998
- Peg Kirkpatrick, State of Hawaii, 1998
- John Kukulka, State of Connecticut, 1994
- Pauline Locklear, State of North Carolina, 1998
- Sarah Lodge, State of Arkansas, 1998
- Lewis Manilow, State of Illinois, 1998
- Louis Martin, State of California, 1992
- Joan Mathews, State of Georgia, 1992
- Tony Mathews, State of Georgia, 1992
- Johnoween S. Mathis, State of Texas, 1992
- Charles H.A. McAlpin, Territory of U.S. Virgin Islands, 1998
- Ethel McBrayer, Commonwealth of Kentucky, 1998
- Jim McConaha, State of New Hampshire, 1998
- Gertrude McConahay, State of Indiana, 1998
- Eunice Mixon, State of Georgia, 1998
- Bennie Moore, State of Florida, 1995
- Fran Moyer, State of Washington, 1998
- Anne Murphy, State of Colorado, 1995
- David Nelson, State of Utah, 1998
- Madge Overhouse, State of California, 1994
- Frances Parrilla, Commonwealth of Pennsylvania, 1998
- James J. Pasma, State of Montana, 1992
- Carol Pensky, State of Maryland, 1994
- Betsy Rader, State of South Carolina, 1998
- Philip J. Rock, State of Illinois, 1992
- Emma D. Sanders, State of Mississippi, 1998
- Margaret Schelen, State of California, 1993
- Karen Schuler, State of Maine, 1998
- Gene Sisneros, State of New Mexico, 1998
- Edward Smith, State of Illinois, 1995
- Mark E. Sostarich, State of Wisconsin, 1998
- Mariquita "Tita" Torres Souder, Territory of Guam, 1998
- Alta Stephens, State of Missouri, 1998
- Saul Stern, State of Maryland, 1995
- Elbert "Willie" Suggs, District of Columbia, 1998
- Lucille Thu, State of South Dakota, 1998
- Beatrice Tignor, State of Maryland, 1998
- Maida Townsend, State of Vermont, 1998
- Bea Underwood, State of Minnesota, 1998
- Beulah Vernon, State of Oklahoma, 1993
- Pam Wallace, State of Alabama, 1998
- Margaret B. Walsh, State of West Virginia, 1992
- West Virginia Federation of Democratic Women, State of West Virginia, 1998
- Tom Whipple, Commonwealth of Virginia, 1998
- Karen Wingard, State of California, 1998
- Esther Wright, State of Tennessee, 1998
- Irene G. Younkman, State of Kansas, 1998
