= Utah Pride Festival =

LGBT event in Salt Lake City, Utah

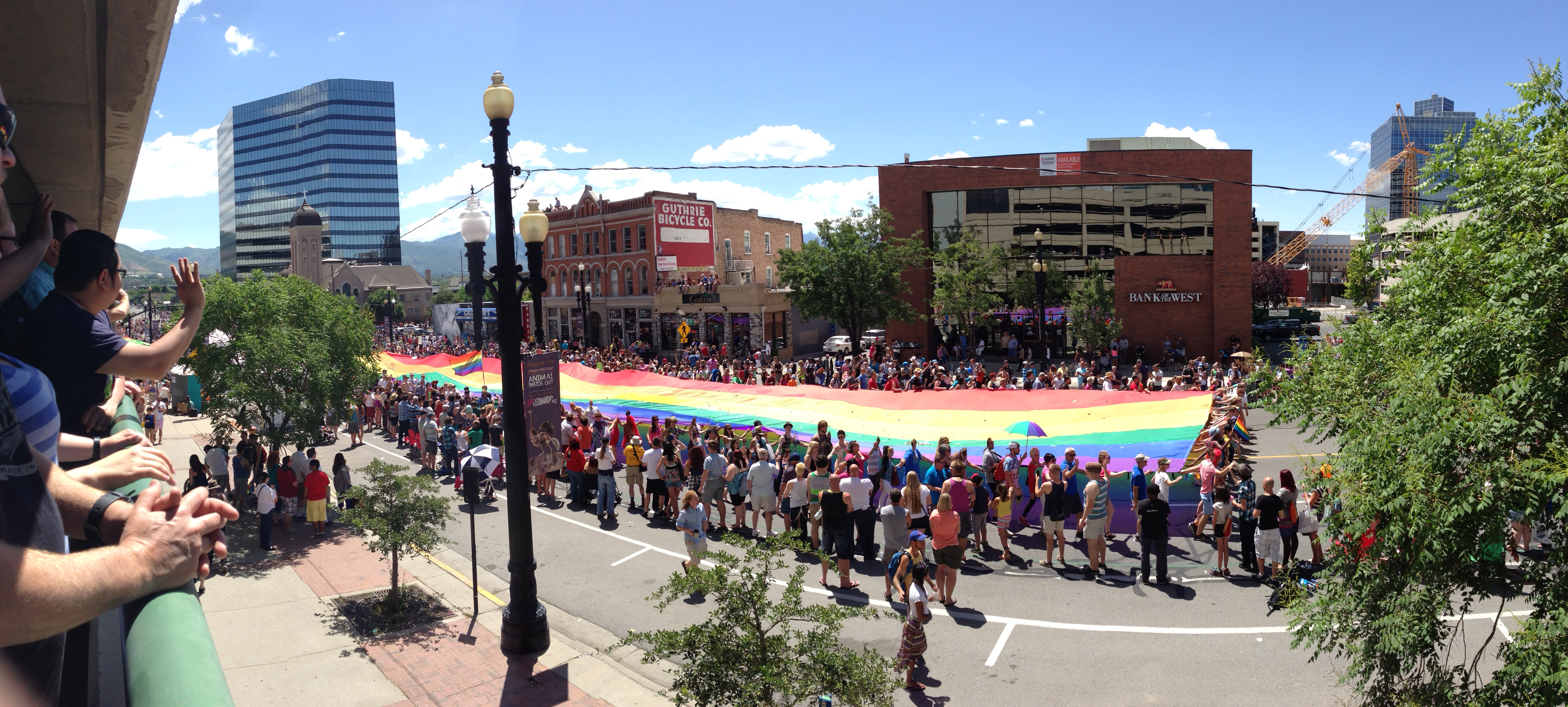
- The rainbow flag at the back of the 2014 Utah Pride parade. People watch from the street, from rooftops, and from a parking structure.
- Status: Active
- Genre: Pride parade
- Location: Salt Lake City, Utah
- Inaugurated: 1977

The Utah Pride Festival is a festival held in downtown Salt Lake City in June celebrating Utah's diversity and gay, lesbian, bisexual, and transgender (LGBTQ) community. The event is a program of the Utah Pride Center, and includes the state's second-largest parade, after the Days of '47 Parade.

== Festivities ==
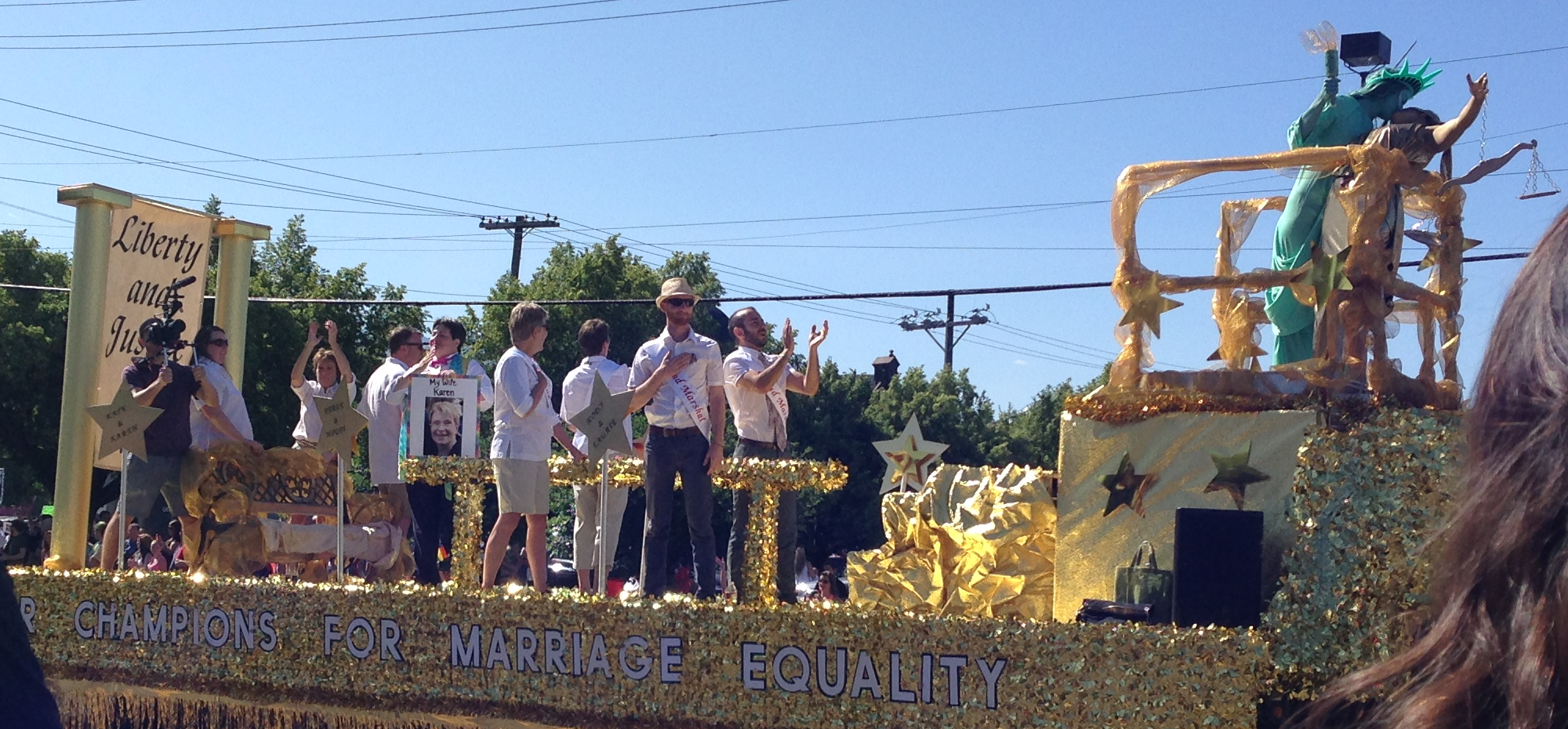
The Kitchen v. Herbert plaintiffs participate as grand marshals while Lady Liberty and Lady Justice kiss at the 2014 Utah Pride parade in Salt Lake City. The words on the side of the float read, "Our Champions for Marriage Equality".

The festival includes the parade, a film festival, the Dyke March, members of the Bear Clan, Leathermen, and the Sisters of bondage subcultures, an interfaith service by the Utah Pride Interfaith Coalition, 5K charity run, and related parties and receptions.

Participation in the festival cuts across a broad spectrum of Utahans. Past speakers during the celebration have ranged from Salt Lake City Mayor Rocky Anderson, who was quoted in support of same-sex marriage, to Utah Rep. Jackie Biskupski, the state's first openly lesbian legislator (later became Salt Lake City's first openly lesbian mayor).

The festival's last day (Sunday) begins with the parade. Participants have included Mayor Ralph Becker, County Mayor Ben McAdams, a group of uniformed Boy Scouts, the largest group - Mormons Building Bridges, Mormons for Equality, the Provo Pride Council, Westminster College (Utah), and Weber State University. Over 140 organizations, sponsors, and religious groups participate. A large rainbow flag fills the street at the back of the parade.

== History ==
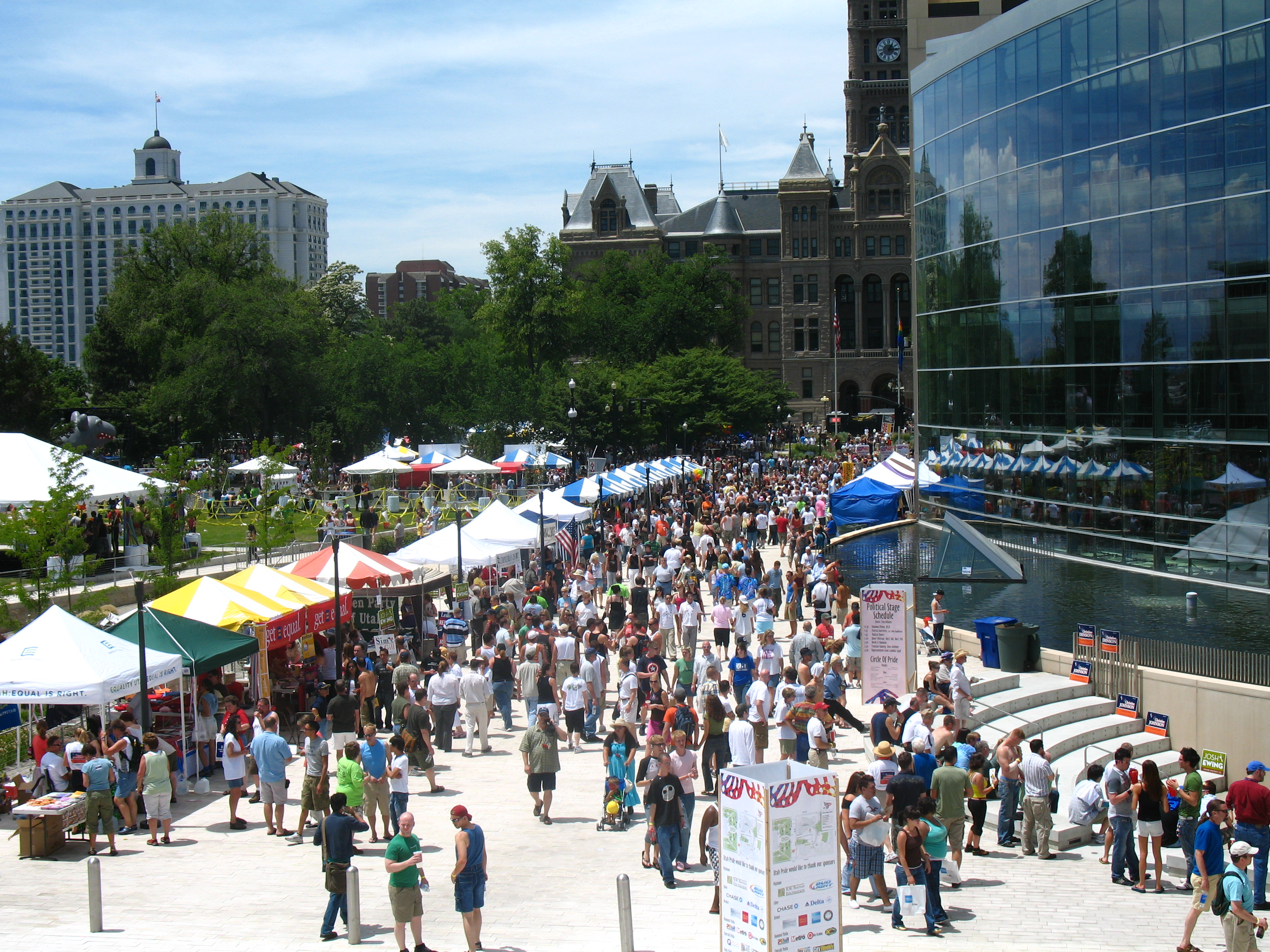
Salt Lake City Library during the 2006 Utah Pride Festival, which was centered around the Salt Lake City and County Building in the background

The festival began in 1977 when the Salt Lake Coalition for Human Rights sponsored a three-day conference. Affirmation: LGBTQ Mormons, Families, & Friends (then called Gay Mormons United) was founded during this conference, on June 11. The 1978 keynote speakers were David Kopay, the first NFL player to come out of the closet, and U.S. Air Force Sgt. Leonard Matlovich, an ex-Mormon who was the first openly gay person to appear on the cover of Time magazine.

Utah Pride Inc. was created in 1989 through 2004 as a project of the Gay and Lesbian Community Council of Utah. The project was renamed Pride of Utah in 2006.

The first Pride march in the state was held June 27, 1990 at the state capitol building. It began on the steps of the capitol, went down Main street, and ended on South Temple at the Utah Museum of Contemporary Art (then the Salt Lake Art Center). It included a procession of 270. In 1991, the Utah Stonewall Center opened and Pride festivities moved to the Salt Lake County Fairgrounds in Murray, Utah. The march attracted twice as many participants along with opposition by members of the Aryan Nation. The Pride Day Art Expo and Competition was created to award local artists with its Lesbian and Gay Pride Art Award and the Mapplethorpe Award.

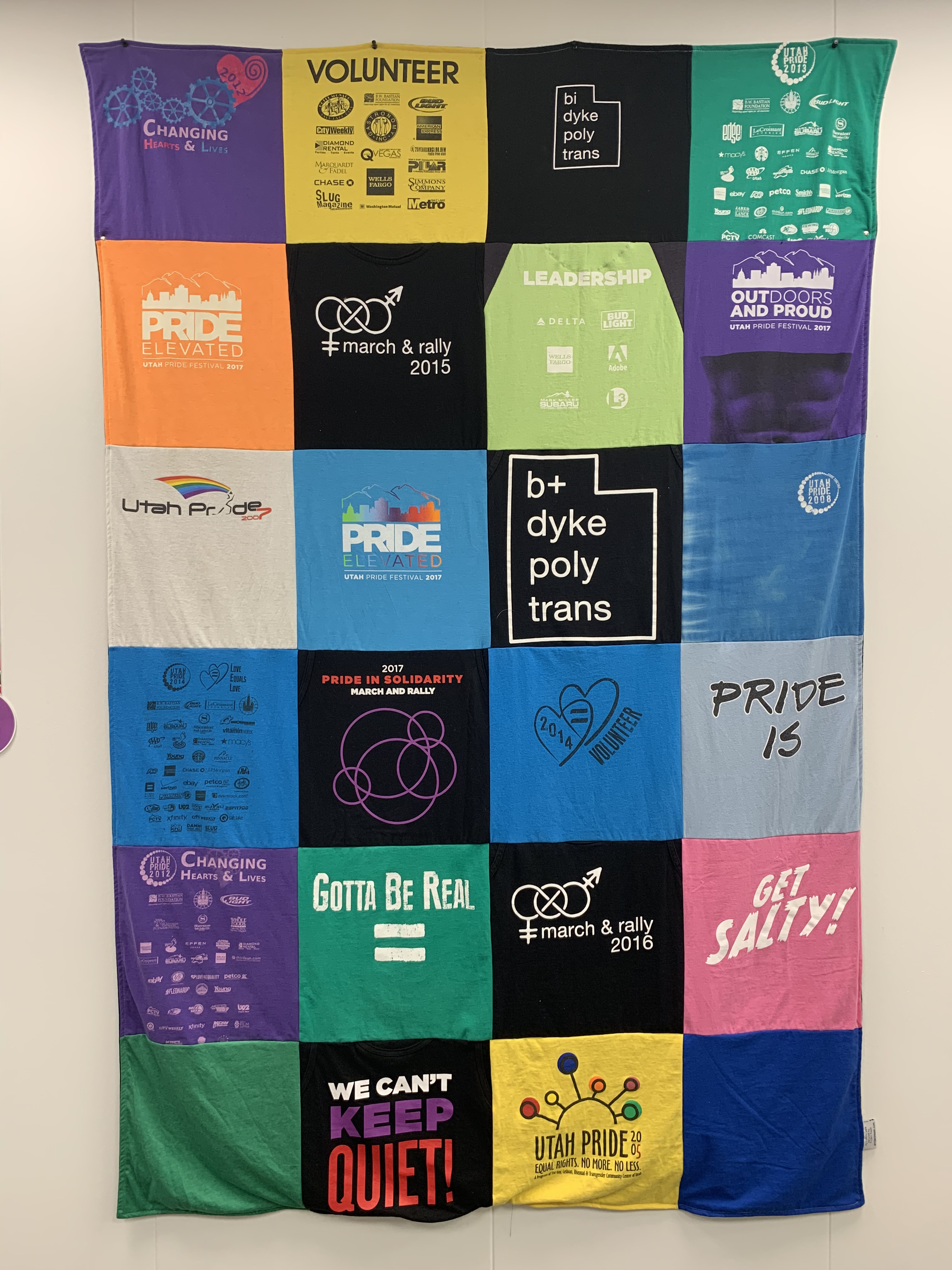
A quilt of past Utah Pride Festival shirts and events

In 1997, a football field-length pride flag was made to carry down the parade route. It was produced by Rev. Bruce Barton of the Metropolitan Community Church of Salt Lake City, UT along with a dozen helpers (including Bruce Harmon, Jeff Freedman, Carrie Gayler, Lynn Sasaki, Terry Gillman and Garth Snyder) who called it a "tremendous symbol of pride and unity." Completed the day of the parade (June 8 at 4:15 am), this 300 foot long flag was composed of 35 bolts of lightweight fabric in six colors. It took more than 80 hours to sew. Over 100 marchers would hold the sides. People often threw donations onto the flag, and children would run around underneath. The first flag bearers were members of the Utah Gay and Lesbian Youth group and some others that did not belong to a community organization. They took it from the Utah State Capitol Building, down State Street, past the LDS Church Office Building, and on to the Salt Lake City and County Building. By 2012, the original flag had seen better days, and a new one from Colonial Flag was purchased for $5,000. It is 30x200 feet and made of nylon, with hand holds every 18 inches. Also, Utah Pride Center gifted Moab Pride their own 100 foot flag.

In 2004, an estimated 50,000 people attended, the largest since the festival began. However, in 2005, the first year in which an admission was charged, attendance at the festival was 15,000 to 20,000. Some have attributed this decline to patrons not wanting to pay for admission to the festival. Festival organizers argued that it was the first year in which an accurate method of counting the attendance was employed and that the numbers did not reflect a drop in attendance.

In 2011 the first local pride festival was held in Moab, Utah.

The 2012 festival included performers Frenchie Davis and Prince Poppycock

In 2013, pride spread to Provo, Utah, with their first pride.

In 2014, Mayor Ralph Becker threw a private wedding reception for couples whose marriages he performed on the first day that same-sex marriage became legal in Utah.

Pride reached Ogden, Utah, in 2015 when they held their first pride festival.

2016 was the first year panel discussions were held during the festival, inside the Salt Lake City Public Library.

2020 saw the festival postponed till September due to the COVID-19 pandemic, but ultimately happened in October, with the First Utah Pride Road Ralley.

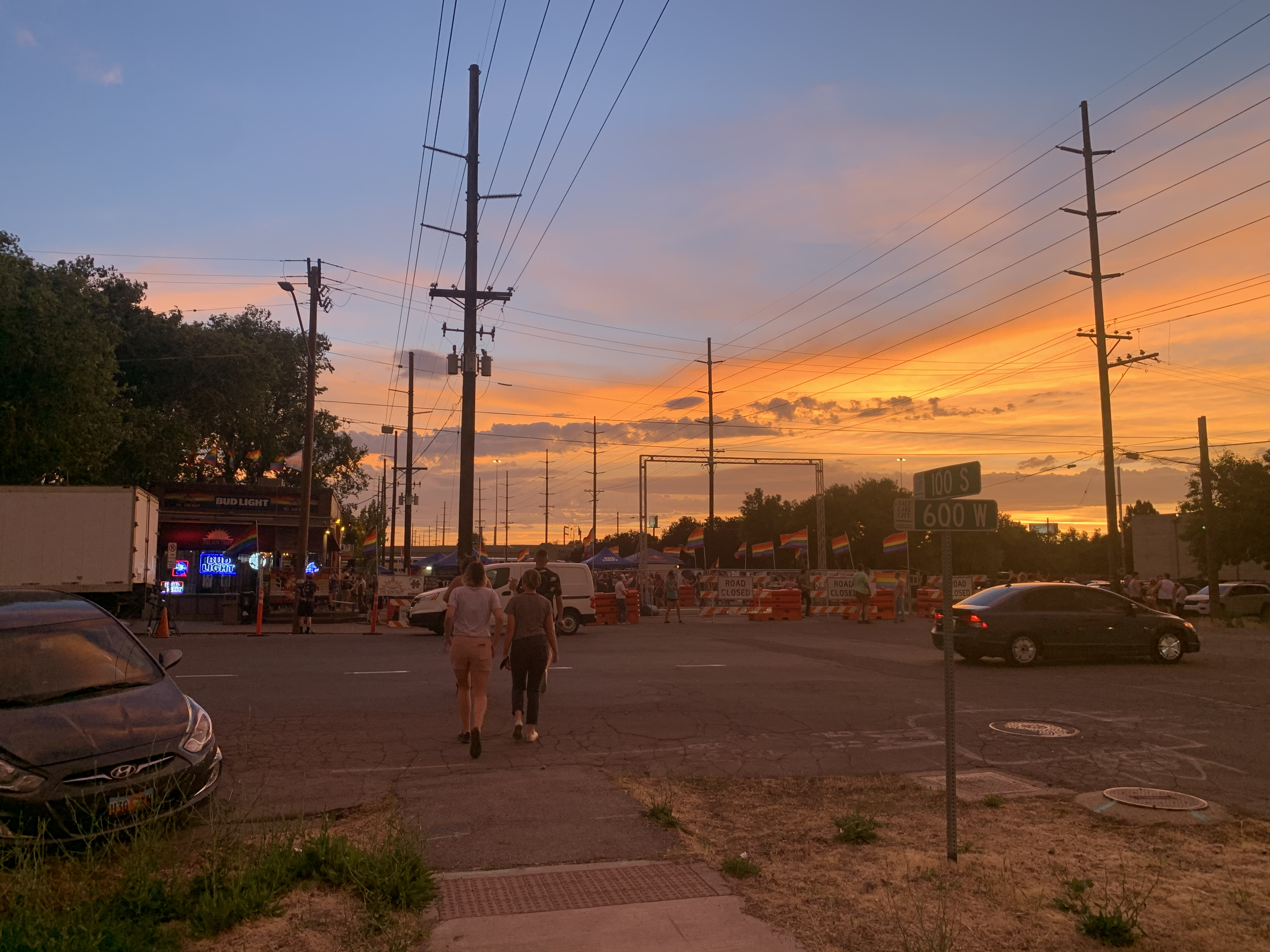
Utah Pride Festival 2021 After Party at The Sun Trapp Bar

2021 was restructured as a Pride Week, much like early pride festivals of the early 1990s due to the ongoing wake of the COVID-19 pandemic and issues with ensuring proper health for the populace with vaccinated/unvaccinated peoples. Events included walk through exhibits, online inter-faith, and a march starting near the Utah State Capitol building at 300 North State St., marchers carried the 300 foot rainbow flag and the first balloon arch. The flag and balloon arch marched down State Street and met the next balloon arch, and then the next balloon arch, and the next, until all had joined together to create a massive balloon arch of over 1000 balloons, as the march reached Harvey Milk Boulevard and 600 east at Liberty Park.

Utah Pride Festival History
Year	Dates	Festival name	Theme	Grand Marshal	Estimated attendance	Location
May 1974		Beer Bust Kegger				
1975	June 1	Gay Freedom Day				
1976		Memorial Day Kegger				
1977	June 10 – 12		Human Rights		400	
1978	June	Pride Day		Leonard Matlovich, David Kopay		
1983		Day in the Park	Basket Social			Fairmont Park, SLC UT
1984	June 24	Day in the Park	We Are What We Are		1300-1700	Fairmont Park, SLC UT
1985		Day in the Park				Sunnyside Park, SLC UT
1986	July 13	Day in the Park			200	Pioneer Park, SLC UT
1987	July 12	Day in the Park			300-400	Sunnyside Park, SLC UT
1988	July 17	Day in the Park			1200	Sunnyside Park, SLC UT
1989	July 30	Day in the Park	A Generation of Pride	Salt Lake City Councilman Tom Gottfried	1300	Sunnyside Park, SLC UT
1990		Pride Day	Look to the Future	Dr. Kristen Ries		Sunnyside Park, SLC UT
1991	June 14–27	Pride Week	Together in Pride	Dell Richards		Salt Lake County Fair Grounds
1992	June 15–23	Pride Week	Pride=Power	Danny Williams		Salt Lake County Fair Grounds
1993				Walter Larabee		Salt Lake County Fair Grounds
1994	June 12	Pride Day	Stonewall: Twenty-five Years Remembered, Twenty-five Years of Progress	Ben Williams	4000	Northwest Recreation and Community Center, SLC UT)
1995					5000	The Gallivan Center, SLC UT)
1996	June 9	Pride Day	Pride... Without Borders	Chaz Bono		
1997	June 8	Utah Pride Day	Equality Through Visibility	Candace Gingrich		
1998	June 14	Utah Pride Day	Unity Through Diversity	Charlene Orchard and Debra Burrington		
1999	June 13	Utah Pride Day	Prideful Past/Powerful Future	Dan Marshalls with local grand marshals Gary and Millie Watts		
2000	May	Utah Pride Day	A New Era of Pride	Rep Jackie Biskupski		
2001	June 7 – 10	Utah Pride	Embracing Diversity	Mayor of Salt Lake City Rocky Anderson		
2002	June 9	Utah Pride Day	Unity in the Community- Change From Within	Alicia Suazo		
2003			Be Yourself Out Loud			
2004	June 11 – 13	Utah Pride	Come Out, Come Out, Wherever You Are!	Bruce Bastian	50,000	
2005	June 8 – 12	Utah Pride	Equal Rights. No More. No Less.		15,000 - 20,000	
2006	June 1 – 4	Utah Pride Week	Pride, Not Prejudice	Boyer Jarvis, Ph.D	20,000	
2007	June 1 – 3	Utah Pride Days	United for Equality	John Amaechi		
2008	June 6 – 8	Utah Pride	Come Together	Ralph Becker		
2009	June 5 – 7	Utah Pride Festival	Pride. Voice. Action.	Cleve Jones	20,000	Salt Lake City-County Building
2010	June 4 – 6	Utah Pride Festival	Our History, Our Future	Sister Dottie S. Dixon	25,000	Salt Lake City-County Building
2011	June 3 – 5	Utah Pride Festival	Live. Love. Pride.	Roseanne Barr	28,000	Salt Lake City-County Building
2012	June 1 – 3	Utah Pride Festival	Changing Hearts and Lives	Dustin Lance Black	33,000	Salt Lake City-County Building
2013	May 30 – June 2	Utah Pride Festival	Gotta Be Real-Equality	David Testo	35,000	Salt Lake City-County Building
2014	June 5 – 8	Utah Pride Festival	Love Equals Love	The Three Couples from Utah's Marriage Equality Case: Laurie Wood and Kody Partridge, Moudi Sbeity and Derek Kitchen, Kate Call and Karen Archer	57,000	Salt Lake City-County Building
2015	June 4 – 7	Utah Pride Festival	Pride Is...	Janet Mock	65,000	Salt Lake City-County Building
2016	June 3 – 5	Utah Pride Festival	#WeArePride	Pride Icon Award Recipients: Jimmy Lee and Connell O'Donovan	100,000	Salt Lake City-County Building
2017	June 2 – 4	Utah Pride Festival	Pride Elevated		50,000	Salt Lake City-County Building
2018	June 2 – 3	Utah Pride Festival	Get Salty		100,000	Salt Lake City-County Building
2019	May 31-June 2	Utah Pride Festival	Exist. Resist. Persist: Celebrating 50 Years of Stonewall.		35,000	Salt Lake City-County Building
2020	October 11, 2020	Utah Pride Road Rally (Pride 2.0)	Love On, Live On		Several thousand along route beginning heading south at Main Street and 700 S to Main Street and 2100, returning in "U" turn, turning onto 2100 S, then heading north on State Street and 2100 S to State Street and 700 S, the origin point (700 S).	Salt Lake City-County Building
2021	June 1-7	Pride Week 2021	A-Maze-Ing			Salt Lake City-County Building, Washington Square City-County Building, Liberty Park
2022	May 29-June 5	Pride Week 2022	I Am Utah			
2026	June 5-6		Pride Elevated		50,000	

== See also ==
- List of LGBT events
- Utah Pride Center
