= Stonewall Democrats =

LGBTQ caucus within the Democratic Party

National Federation of Stonewall Democrats
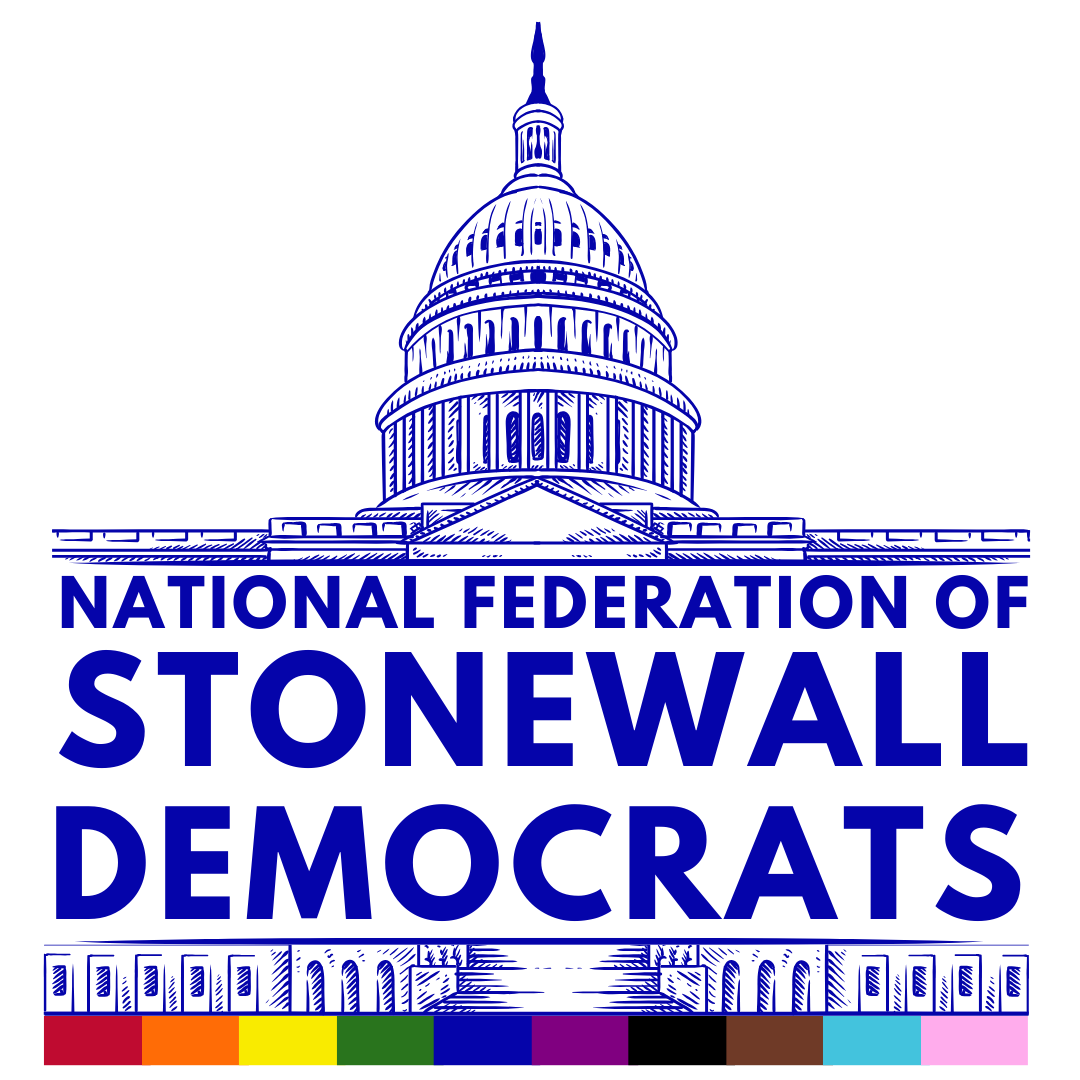
- National Federation of Stonewall Democrats
- Named after: Stonewall Inn / Stonewall riots / Democratic Party
- Predecessor: National Stonewall Democratic Federation
- Formation: January 17, 2025
- Type: Hybrid PAC
- Purpose: To advocate for LGBTQ+ rights, support pro-equality Democratic candidates, strengthen coordination among Stonewall organizations nationwide, and advocate for the LGBTQ+ community within the Democratic National Committee and the Democratic Party.
- President: Jeremy J. Comeau
- Vice President: Kristen Browde
- Clerk: Robert Vargas III
- Treasurer: Renay Grace Rodriguez
- Main organ: Executive Council and Board of Governors
- Website: Official website

Stonewall Democrats
- Named after: Stonewall Inn / Stonewall riots Democratic Party
- Formation: 1971; 55 years ago (Alice B. Toklas Memorial Democratic Club); 1975; 51 years ago (Stonewall Democratic Club)
- Type: LGBT political organization
- Legal status: Active
- Purpose: Elect pro-LGBT Democrats in federal, state, and local elections, serve as a bullhorn for LGBT governmental issues, and supply LGBT voters to ballot boxes
- Location: United States
- Website: Stonewall Democrats directory; National Federation homepage

Stonewall Democrats, also known in some states as LGBT Democrats, is a caucus within the Democratic Party that advocates for issues that are relevant to LGBTQ Americans. The caucus primarily operates through individual chapters or political clubs supporting LGBTQ rights and affiliated with the Democratic Party.

== History ==
In 1971, Alice B. Toklas Memorial Democratic Club of San Francisco was the first registered LGBTQ Democratic club in the nation.

In 1975, the Stonewall Democratic Club was established in Los Angeles, California, the first 'Stonewall Democratic Club' in the country established for LGBTQ individuals and straight allies committed to achieving equality for all and to advancing progressive and feminist values through the Democratic Party.

The National Stonewall Democratic Club was a national organization of LGBTQ Democratic clubs and individuals. It was founded on May 8–10, 1998, in Kansas City, Missouri. On January 1, 2013, National Stonewall Democratic Club suspended operations due to a financial deficit of $30,000.

== National Stonewall Democratic Federation ==
National Stonewall Democratic Organizations
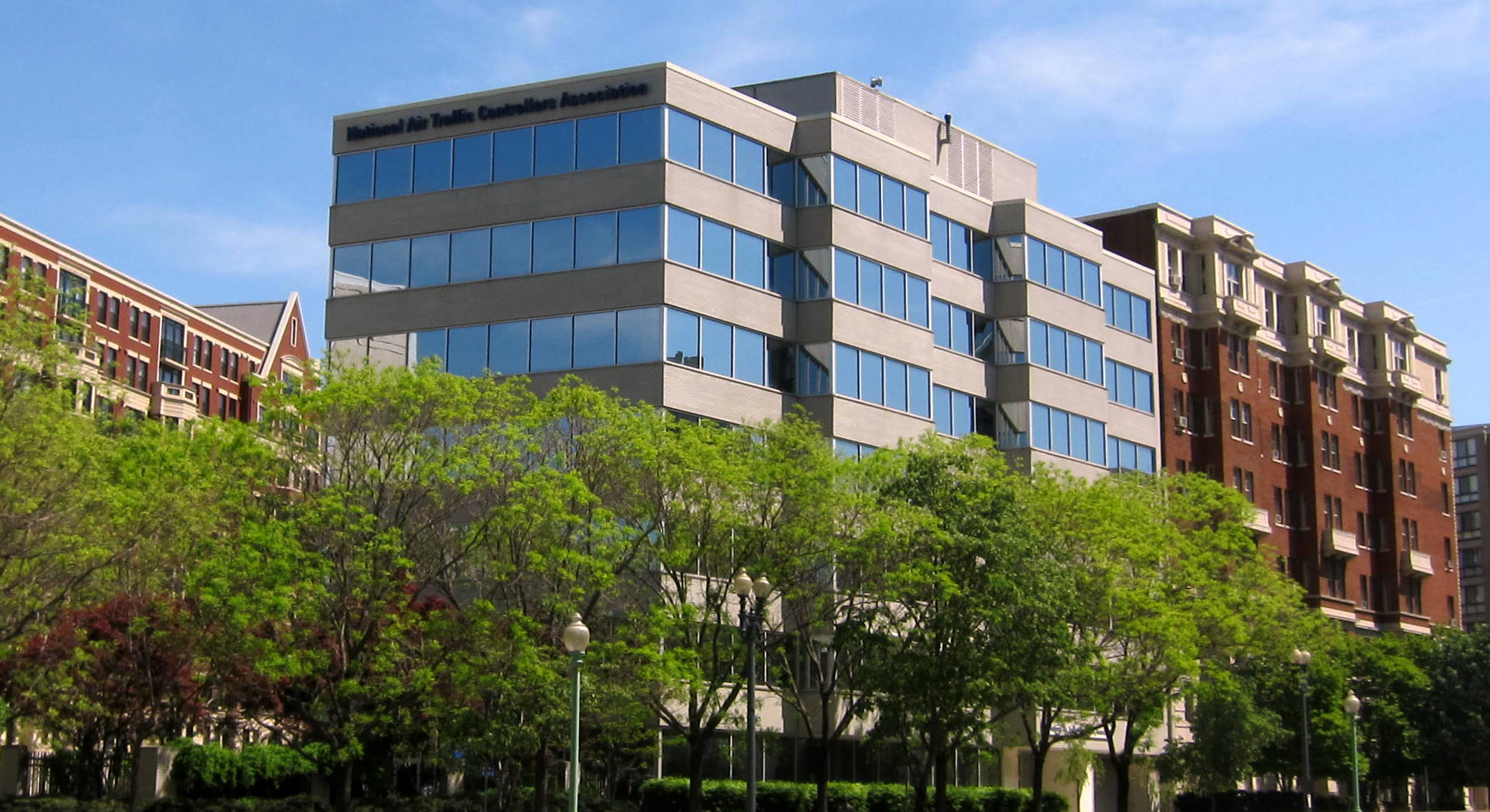
- Building where National Stonewall Democratic Federation was housed in the Logan Circle area of Washington, D.C.
- Named after: Stonewall Inn / Stonewall riots Democratic Party
- Predecessor: National Association of Gay and Lesbian Democratic Clubs
- Successor: LGBT Democrats
- Formation: May 1998; 28 years ago
- Dissolved: January 1, 2013; 13 years ago
- Type: LGBT PAC
- Legal status: Suspended
- Purpose: Grassroots network connecting LGBT Democratic activists
- Location: United States
- Website: National Stonewall Democratic Federation homepage archive

On January 17, 2025, a National Federation of Stonewall Democrats was organized by leaders of Stonewall Democratic clubs and caucuses in 21 states in response to the Second presidency of Donald Trump.

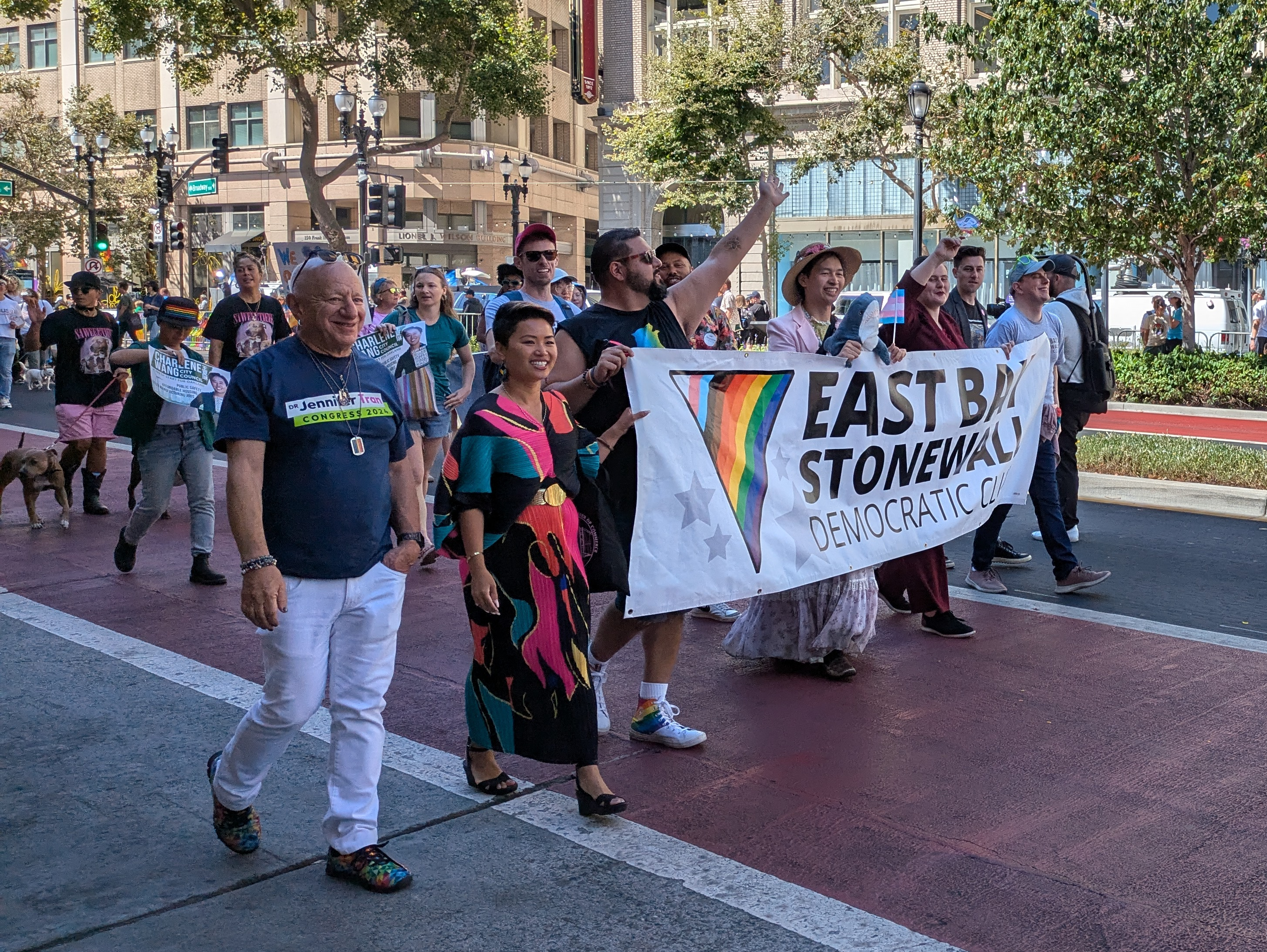
East Bay Stonewall Democratic Club represented at the 2024 Oakland Pride Parade

== Chapters ==
State	Chapter name	Status
Alabama	Alabama Stonewall Democrats	Active
Arkansas	Stonewall Democratic Caucus of Arkansas	Active
Arkansas	Young Democrats of Arkansas Stonewall Caucus	Active
California	Alice B. Toklas LGBT Democratic Club	Active
California	Central Valley Stonewall Democratic Club	Active
California	Desert Stonewall Democrats	Active
California	East Bay Stonewall Democratic Club	Active
California	Fresno Stonewall Democrats	Active
California	Harvey Milk Lesbian, Gay, Bisexual, Transgender Democratic Club	Active
California	Long Beach Lambda Democratic Club	Active
California	San Diego Democrats for Equality	Active
California	Stonewall Democratic Club	Active
California	Stonewall Young Democrats	Active
California	Stonewall Democrats Sacramento	Active
California	Stonewall Democrats of Tuolumne County	Active
California	Stonewall Democrats of Ventura County	Active
California	Tulare County Stonewall Democrats	Active
Colorado	Stonewall Democrats of Colorado	Active
Colorado	Jeffco Dems LGBTQ Caucus	Active
Colorado	Stonewall Democrats of Pikes Peak	Active
Delaware	Barbara Gittings Delaware Stonewall Democrats	Active
	LGBT Caucus	Active
District of Columbia	Capital Stonewall Democrats	Active
Florida	Florida LGBTA Democratic Caucus	Active
Florida	Stonewall Democrats of Alachua County	Active
Florida	Capital City GLBTA Democratic Caucus	Active
Florida	Dolphin Democrats	Active
Florida	Freedom Democrats	Active
Florida	Hillsborough County LGBTA Democratic Caucus	Active
Florida	Manatee LGBTA Democratic Caucus	Active
Florida	Rainbow Democratic Club of Orange County	Active
Florida	Stonewall Democrats of Pinellas County	Active
Georgia	Georgia Stonewall Democrats	Active
Hawaii	LGBT Caucus of the Democratic Party of Hawai'i	Active
Iowa	Iowa Democratic Stonewall Caucus	Active
Iowa	Linn County Stonewall Democrats	Active
Idaho	LGBTA Democratic Caucus of Idaho	Active
Indiana	Indiana Stonewall Democrats	Active
Kansas	Kansas Democratic LGBT Caucus	Active
Louisiana	Louisiana Stonewall Democrats	Active
Maryland	Young Democrats of Maryland LGBT Caucus	Active
Massachusetts	Bay State Stonewall Democrats	Active
Michigan	The LGBT and Allies Caucus of the Michigan Democratic Party	Active
Michigan	Stonewall Democrats at the University of Michigan	Active
Minnesota	Stonewall DFL	Active
Missouri	Four Freedoms Democratic Club	Active
Missouri	Kansas City Pride Democratic Club	Active
Missouri	Stonewall Democrats of Eastern Missouri	Active
Mississippi	Mississippi Stonewall Democrats	Active
Montana	Montana Stonewall Democrats	Active
Nebraska	Nebraska Stonewall Democrats	Active
Nevada	Stonewall Northern Nevada	Active
Nevada	Stonewall Democratic Club of Southern Nevada	Active
New Hampshire	New Hampshire Stonewall Democrats	Active
New Jersey	New Jersey Stonewall Democrats	Active
New York	Stonewall Democratic Club (Stonewall Democrats) of New York City	Active
New York	Jim Owles Liberal Democratic Club	Active
New York	Lambda Independent Democrats of Brooklyn	Active
New York	The Lavender Line Democratic Club of Queens (formerly The Lesbian and Gay Democratic Club of Queens)	Active
New York	Gay & Lesbian Independent Democrats (of New York County)	Active
New York	GLBT Democrats of Long Island	Active
New York	Stonewall Democrats of Western New York	Active
New York	Bronx Rainbow Democratic Coalition	Active
New York	Hudson Valley Stonewall Democrats	Active
North Carolina	LGBT Democrats of North Carolina	Active
North Carolina	LGBT Democrats of Gaston County	Active
North Carolina	New Hanover County Democratic Party - Stonewall Democrats	Active
Ohio	Cleveland Stonewall Democrats	Active
Ohio	Mahoning Valley Stonewall Democrats	Active
Ohio	Stonewall Democrats of Central Ohio	Active
Ohio	Stonewall Democrats of Summit County	Active
Oklahoma	Oklahoma Stonewall Democrats	Active
Oregon	Oregon Stonewall Democrats	Active
Pennsylvania	Liberty City LGBT Democratic Club	Active
Pennsylvania	Steel City Stonewall Democrats	Active
Pennsylvania	Capital Region Stonewall Democrats	Active
South Carolina	South Carolina Stonewall Democrats	Inactive
Tennessee	Tennessee Stonewall Democratic Caucus	Inactive
Texas	Texas Stonewall Democrats	Active
Texas	East Texas Stonewall Democrats	Active
Texas	Houston Area Stonewall Democrats	Active
Texas	Houston Stonewall Young Democrats	Active
Texas	Stonewall Democrats Denton County	Active
Texas	Stonewall Democrats of Austin	Active
Texas	Stonewall Democrats Central Texas	Active
Texas	Stonewall Democrats of Dallas	Active
Texas	Dallas Stonewall Young Democrats	Active
Texas	Stonewall Democrats of Lubbock	Active
Texas	Stonewall Democrats of San Antonio	Active
Texas	Stonewall Democrats-Rio Grande Valley	Active
Texas	Stonewall Democrats Tarrant County	Active
Texas	Texas Young Democrats Stonewall Caucus	Active
Texas	Bastrop County Stonewall Democrats	Active
Texas	Chisholm Trail Stonewall Democrats of Johnson County	Active
Utah	Stonewall Democrats Utah	Active
Virginia	LGBT Democrats of Virginia	Active
Washington	Washington State Stonewall Caucus Democrats	Active
Washington	Clark County Stonewall Caucus Democrats	Active
Wisconsin	WI Stonewall Democrats	Inactive

== See also ==
- Democratic Party
- List of LGBT rights organizations
- Log Cabin Republicans
