= Utah Pride Center =

Nonprofit organization

- Founded: 1991; 35 years ago
- Type: Nonprofit organization
- Legal status: 501(c)(3)
- Location: 68 South Main Street, 9th Floor Salt Lake City, Utah, United States
- Executive director: Chad Call
- Employees: 3 (2025)
- Website: www.utahpridecenter.org

The Utah Pride Center (UPC) is a tax-exempt nonprofit organization in Salt Lake City. It provides services, events and activities to lesbian, gay, bisexual and transgender (LGBTQ) people in Utah. The center manages annual and ongoing projects including the Utah Pride Festival.

== History ==
Three LGBT centers were created in Utah from the 1970s through the 1990s. The name of the most recent center, Utah Stonewall Center, has been changed three times since its creation in 1991 as a project of the Gay and Lesbian Community Council of Utah.

=== Gay Community Services Center Inc. ===
The first LGBT community center in Utah was the Gay Community Services Center Inc. in 1975 through 1979. Its executive directors were Dorothy Makin and Ken Storer.

=== Gay Community Service Center and Clinic ===
The Gay Community Service Center and Clinic was created in 1984. Its executive directors were Auntie Dé and Beau Chainé.

=== Utah Stonewall Center ===
The Utah Stonewall Center was created in 1991 through 1996 as a project of the Gay and Lesbian Community Council of Utah. The executive directors of the center were Craig Miller, Melissa Sillitoe, John Bennett, Renee Rinaldi, Michael O'Brien and Alan Ahtow.

=== Gay and Lesbian Community Center of Utah ===
The center was renamed in 1997 through 2004 as the Gay and Lesbian Community Center of Utah. Its executive directors were Monique Predovitch, Doug Wortham and Paula Wolfe.

=== Gay Lesbian Bisexual Transgender Community Center of Utah ===
The center was renamed in 2003 as the Gay Lesbian Bisexual Transgender Community Center of Utah. Its executive directors were Chad Beyer and Valerie A. Larabee.

=== Utah Pride Center ===
An advertisement for a Utah Pride Center location in downtown Salt Lake City

The center was renamed in 2006 as the Utah Pride Center. Larabee resigned in 2013 as the center executive director after it experienced struggles with financial and leadership issues, and its staffers assumed her duties until a new executive director was appointed. Center Treasurer Steven Ha was appointed in 2014 to serve as the center interim executive director, and was later employed for one year as the center executive director. On December 12, 2014, less than a year after his appointment, the Utah Pride Center announced the resignation of Steven Ha due to a recurrence of lymphoma. Marian Edmonds-Allen was named executive director in August 2015. Carol Gnade was named executive director October 1, 2015, with a mandate to move to a new building. Robert Moolman was named executive director May 1, 2018; serving during the unique challenge of the Covid pandemic. Stacey Jackson-Roberts was named executive director January 2021 to October 2021. The Utah Pride Center switched to a new CO-CEO model in January 2022; naming Jessica Dummar (to July 2022), Ben Carr (to June 2023), Tanya Hawkins (to September 2023) -- and then Amanda Darrow (October 2022 to April 2023), and Jonathan Foulk (October 2022 to August 2023). The Utah Pride Center in a financial crisis, named Ryan Newcomb executive director September 2023 to April 2024; the center was refinanced and moved. Chad Call (having served as Utah Pride Parade director 2022, 2023, 2024) was named executive director April 2024.

== Programs ==
- Health & Wellness
- Social Programs
- Advocacy & Education
- LGBTQ Elders 50+
- Transgender
- Youth
- Support Groups

Additionally, the center provides meeting space, financial assistance and guidance to a number of smaller organizations known as affiliate programs, sponsors inter-organizational programs such the Utah GLBT Leadership Task Force, Utah GLBT Mental Health Task Force. In 2009, part of the organization split into the separate Transgender Education Advocates of Utah.

== Library ==
The Utah Stonewall Library was founded in June 1991 by Robert Smith and Liza Smart, Chairs of the Utah Stonewall Committee of The Gay and Lesbian Community Council of Utah (GLCCU). It was an integral part of the Utah Stonewall Center from its inception and was established as a community-based information center, dedicated to the promotion of Lesbian and Gay visibility and viability by means of the accumulation of Bisexual, Gay, Lesbian and Transgender archives, literature, music, film, art, history, culture, humor, education and fiction - and the dissemination of these materials to the public at large. The selection criteria included authors, stories, characters or titles that are LGBT+ affirming or iconic figures that were influenced by the community. The lending library is based on the honor system and a first name basis, allowing anyone to provide their chosen name/identities and to feel free to study and read topics of their interests free of shame and stigma.

In addition, the special collections section included the following Utah Stonewall Historical Society and Archives for Gay and Lesbian Studies, Stonewall Center and Utah Pride Center materials: administrative files, brochures, committee files, contracts, daily office files, financial documents, historical records, manuals, meeting minutes, memorabilia, newsletters, office files, office references, organization files, pamphlets, photos, physical objects, posters, publications and subject files.

These library archives have been donated and now reside as the Utah Pride Center (1975–2012) set at the University of Utah, Special Collections, J. Willard Marriott Library. New material up to 2017 exists, but will not be available until indexed.

In 1996 the library had reached ~2,000 books—but a temporary closure resulted in a bulk loss of books and archives. By 2017, the library had once again expanded to ~3,400 books.

Historical primary librarians shaping the permanent/archival lending library include:

- Robert "Bobbie" Smith who was the first library director lecturing in gay literature who, during the Utah Beyond Stonewall retreat in 1989, saw the need for an archival lending library; donating the first ~500 books and curating the collection to ~1,000; inspiring others to donate.
- Ben Williams focused on archives and keeping the collection ordered during his off-time hours from 1993 to 1994. His community historian skills have expanded the community's knowledge both then and now, and he was the first full-time volunteer librarian.
- Michelle Davies (LS) standardized library practice and policy.
- Jacob Corbaley curated and maintained the collection.
- Liz Pitts (MLS) with a professional background in library services recategorized, weeded and catalogued the collection under Library Thing; patronage of the available titles shot up.
- Daniel Cureton (MLS) for two years was the first paid queer librarian who acquired grants such as the Library Services and Technology Act as funded by the Institute of Museum and Library Services and administered by Utah State Division of Libraries. He expanded the library's mission by building institutional memory, knowledge of the library's past, increasing inclusion, and networking resources to other libraries and communities.

In 2017, Cureton and UPC executive director Carol Gnade arranged for the Salt Lake City Library to host the lending collection at the Main Library branch. This made the library available to the public at-large, and also saved valuable space at the new UPC location. This arrangement extends to 2022.

The catalog set can be seen at the External Link below.

== See also ==
- List of LGBT community centers
- Utah Pride Festival
