= QSaltLake =

American LGBTQ magazine

- QSaltLake cover (October 16, 2007)
- Editor: Michael Aaron
- Categories: News magazine
- Frequency: Monthly
- Circulation: 10,000 (approximate)
- Publisher: Michael Aaron
- First issue: April 29, 2004
- Company: Salt Lick Publishing, LLC
- Country: USA
- Based in: Salt Lake City, Utah
- Website: qsaltlake.com

QSaltLake is a lesbian, gay, bisexual and transgender (LGBTQ) news and entertainment magazine published monthly by Gay Salt Lake Inc. in Salt Lake City. The magazine is the feature publication for the corporation. Related publications, web sites and a nonprofit organization are among the corporate projects.

The magazine includes local, national and world news, an opinion section, arts and entertainment, a bar guide and classifieds. The magazine moved in 2007 to new offices in the Sugar House neighborhood of Salt Lake City, and created a news-portal web site.

== History ==
Utah gay activist Michael Aaron approached Steven Peterson in 2004 to publish what Aaron called a professional newspaper for Utah's LGBT community. Aaron had co-published the Community Reporter newspaper and Triangle Magazine in the 1980s and 90s. Peterson had published the Little Lavender Book business and organization directory.

The first issue of Salt Lake Metro newspaper was published in 2004 by Metro Publishing Inc. with Aaron as publisher and Peterson as sales manager. The newspaper began publishing when an LGBT campaign against a proposed state constitutional amendment to prohibit same-sex marriage was developing. The focus on hard news and editorial content was intended to distinguish it from other local publications.

Aaron left Metro Publishing Inc. in 2006 after a failed attempt to purchase it. The remaining writers and office staff went with him and QSaltLake newspaper was published two weeks later by Salt Lick Publishing LLC. The newspaper featured local and national news, opinion—both serious and camp, arts and entertainment, and sports. Cover stories ranged from the use of methamphetamine in the LGBT community to an interview with entertainer RuPaul. The newspaper created its annual readers' choice Fabby Awards ceremony in 2005.

As QSaltLake owner and publisher, Aaron won the 2011 Utah Pride Festival "Dr. Kristen Ries Community Service Award."

QSaltLake was redesigned as a magazine in 2012 when Salt Lick Publishing LLC. The corporation continued the management and publication of the magazine and its projects despite a financial-loan shortfall that year.

=== Editors ===
- Brandon Burt, April–November 2004
- Jere Keys, November 2004–November 2005
- Michael Aaron, November 2005–February 2006
- Tony Hobday, March 2006
- Kenni Littlefield, March 2006–June 2006
- Michael Aaron, June 2006–February 2011, June 2013–present
- Seth Bracken, February 2011–June 2013
- Assistant Editor: JoSelle Vanderhooft, January 2007–February 2011
- Arts Editor: Tony Hobday, March 2006–December 2020

== QPages Directory ==
Salt Lick Publishing LLC also publishes an annual LGBT business and organization directory, QPages Directory, formerly named Gay Salt Lake Directory, Salt Lake PINQ Pages, TheQPages and QSaltLake Pages; and TheQMap, a map of Salt Lake LGBT-friendly businesses for tourists and business visitors.

== QCares Foundation ==
Salt Lick Publishing LLC's nonprofit organization, QCares Foundation, raises funds for Utah LGBT charities, sponsors an anti-meth campaign, and a hepatitis-immunization awareness program for gay men. The organization is also an affiliate of the People With AIDS Coalition of Utah.

== See also ==
- LGBT rights in Utah
- List of LGBT rights activists
