= Satellite Award for Best Actor in a Supporting Role =

Annual film award

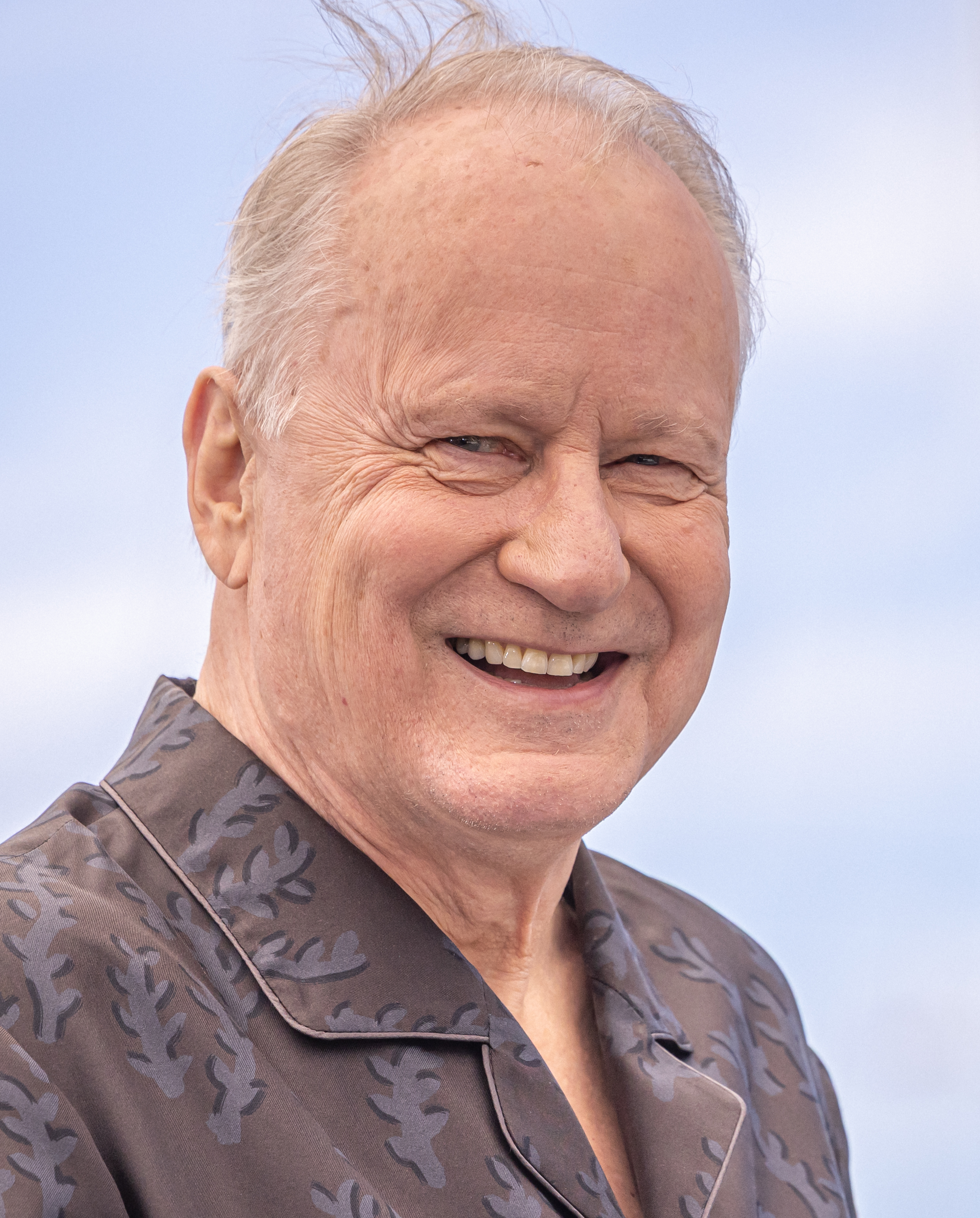
- The 2025 recipient: Stellan Skarsgård
- Awarded for: Best Actor in a Supporting Role
- Country: United States
- Presented by: International Press Academy
- First award: 1996
- Currently held by: Stellan Skarsgård – Sentimental Value (2025)

The Satellite Award for Best Actor in a Supporting Role is one of the annual Satellite Awards given by the International Press Academy. From 1996 to 2005, two categories were presented for supporting performances by male actors, one for performances in a drama film and other for performances in comedy or musical films. In 2006, both categories were merged into the current category without distinction by genre.

== Winners and nominees ==
Winners are listed in bold type.

=== Drama (1996–2005) ===
Year	Actor	Film	Role
1996	**Armin Mueller-Stahl**	**Shine**	**Peter Helfgott**
1996	Steve Buscemi	Fargo	Carl Showalter
1996	Robert Carlyle	Trainspotting	Francis "Franco" Begbie
1996	Jeremy Irons	Stealing Beauty	Alex Parrish
1996	John Lynch	Moll Flanders	Jonathan (the Artist)
1996	Paul Scofield	The Crucible	Thomas Danforth
1997	**Burt Reynolds**	**Boogie Nights**	**Jack Horner**
1997	Billy Connolly	Mrs Brown	John Brown
1997	Danny DeVito	The Rainmaker	Deck Shifflet
1997	Samuel L. Jackson	Eve's Bayou	Louis Batiste
1997	Robin Williams	Good Will Hunting	Dr. Sean Maguire
1998	**Donald Sutherland**	**Without Limits**	**Bill Bowerman**
1998	Robert Duvall	A Civil Action	Jerome Facher
1998	Jason Patric	Your Friends & Neighbors	Cary
1998	Billy Bob Thornton	A Simple Plan	Jacob Mitchell
1998	Tom Sizemore	Saving Private Ryan	Mike Horvath
1999	**Harry J. Lennix**	**Titus**	**Aaron**
1999	Tom Cruise	Magnolia	Frank "T.J." Mackey
1999	Michael Caine	The Cider House Rules	Wilbur Larch
1999	Doug Hutchison	The Green Mile	Percy Wetmore
1999	Jude Law	The Talented Mr. Ripley	Dickie Greenleaf
1999	Christopher Plummer	The Insider	Mike Wallace
2000	**Bruce Greenwood**	**Thirteen Days**	**John F. Kennedy**
2000	Jeff Bridges	The Contender	Jackson Evans
2000	Benicio del Toro	Traffic	Javier Rodriguez
2000	Robert De Niro	Men of Honor	Billy Sunday
2000	Albert Finney	Erin Brockovich	Edward L. Masry
2000	Joaquin Phoenix	Gladiator	Commodus
2001	**Ben Kingsley**	**Sexy Beast**	**Don Logan**
2001	Jim Broadbent	Iris	John Bayley
2001	Billy Crudup	Charlotte Gray	Julien Levade
2001	Ed Harris	A Beautiful Mind	William Parcher
2001	Ian McKellen	The Lord of the Rings: The Fellowship of the Ring	Gandalf
2001	Goran Visnjic	The Deep End	Alek "Al" Spera
2002	**Dennis Haysbert**	**Far from Heaven**	**Raymond Deagan**
2002	Jeremy Davies	Solaris	Snow
2002	Viggo Mortensen	The Lord of the Rings: The Two Towers	Aragorn
2002	Paul Newman	Road to Perdition	John Rooney
2002	Alfred Molina	Frida	Diego Rivera
2002	Dennis Quaid	Far from Heaven	Frank Whitaker
2003	**Djimon Hounsou**	**In America**	**Mateo**
2003	Alec Baldwin	The Cooler	Shelly Kaplow
2003	Jeff Bridges	Seabiscuit	Charles S. Howard
2003	Benicio del Toro	21 Grams	Jack Jordan
2003	Omar Sharif	Monsieur Ibrahim et les fleurs du Coran	Ibrahim Demildji
2003	Ken Watanabe	The Last Samurai	Moritsugu Katsumoto
2004	**Christopher Walken**	**Around the Bend**	**Turner Lair**
2004	David Carradine	Kill Bill: Volume 2	Bill
2004	Jamie Foxx	Collateral	Max Durocher
2004	Alfred Molina	Spider-Man 2	Otto Octavius / Doctor Octopus
2004	Clive Owen	Closer	Larry Gray
2004	Peter Sarsgaard	Kinsey	Clyde Martin
2005	**Danny Huston**	**The Constant Gardener**	**Sandy Woodrow**
2005	Chris Cooper	Capote	Alvin Dewey
2005	Jake Gyllenhaal	Brokeback Mountain	Jack Twist
2005	Edward Norton	Kingdom of Heaven	Baldwin IV of Jerusalem
2005	Mickey Rourke	Sin City	Marv
2005	Peter Sarsgaard	Jarhead	Alan Troy

=== Musical or Comedy (1996–2005) ===
Year	Actor	Film	Role
1996	**Cuba Gooding Jr.**	**Jerry Maguire**	**Rod Tidwell**
1996	Woody Allen	Everyone Says I Love You	Joe Berlin
1996	Danny DeVito	Matilda	Harry Wormwood
1996	Gene Hackman	The Birdcage	Kevin Keeley
1996	Ian McKellen	Cold Comfort Farm	Amos Starkadder
1997	**Rupert Everett**	**My Best Friend's Wedding**	**George Downes**
1997	Mark Addy	The Full Monty	Dave Horsefall
1997	Cuba Gooding Jr.	As Good as It Gets	Frank Sachs
1997	Greg Kinnear	As Good as It Gets	Simon Bishop
1997	Rip Torn	Men in Black	Agent Zed
1998	**Bill Murray**	**Rushmore**	**Herman Blume**
1998	Jeff Daniels	Pleasantville	Bill Johnson
1998	John Goodman	The Big Lebowski	Walter Sobchak
1998	Bill Nighy	Still Crazy	Ray Simms
1998	Geoffrey Rush	Shakespeare in Love	Philip Henslowe
1999	**William H. Macy**	**Happy, Texas**	**Chappy Dent**
1999	Dan Hedaya	Dick	Richard Nixon
1999	Rhys Ifans	Notting Hill	Spike
1999	Bill Murray	Cradle Will Rock	Tommy Crickshaw
1999	Ving Rhames	Bringing Out the Dead	Marcus
1999	Alan Rickman	Dogma	Metatron
2000	**Willem Dafoe**	**Shadow of the Vampire**	**Max Schreck**
2000	Philip Seymour Hoffman	Almost Famous	Lester Bangs
2000	Morgan Freeman	Nurse Betty	Charlie
2000	Tim Blake Nelson	O Brother, Where Art Thou?	Delmar O'Donnell
2000	Brad Pitt	Snatch.	Mickey O'Neil
2000	Owen Wilson	Shanghai Noon	Roy O'Bannon
2001	**Jim Broadbent**	**Moulin Rouge!**	**Harold Zidler**
2001	Steve Buscemi	Ghost World	Seymour
2001	Hugh Grant	Bridget Jones's Diary	Daniel Cleaver
2001	Carl Reiner	Ocean's Eleven	Saul Bloom
2001	Ben Stiller	The Royal Tenenbaums	Chas Tenenbaum
2001	Owen Wilson	The Royal Tenenbaums	Eli Cash
2002	**Michael Constantine**	**My Big Fat Greek Wedding**	**Kostas "Gus" Portokalos**
2002	Chris Cooper	Adaptation.	John Laroche
2002	Jake Gyllenhaal	The Good Girl	Thomas "Holden" Worther
2002	Philip Seymour Hoffman	Punch-Drunk Love	Dean Trumbell
2002	Nicky Katt	Full Frontal	Adolf Hitler
2002	John C. Reilly	The Good Girl	Phil Last
2003	**Eugene Levy**	**A Mighty Wind**	**Mitch Cohen**
2003	Johnny Depp	Once Upon a Time in Mexico	Sheldon Jeffrey Sands (Eyeless Jack)
2003	Bill Nighy	Love Actually	Billy Mack
2003	Sam Rockwell	Matchstick Men	Frank Mercer
2003	Geoffrey Rush	Pirates of the Caribbean: The Curse of the Black Pearl	Hector Barbossa
2003	Thomas Sangster	Love Actually	Sam
2004	**Thomas Haden Church**	**Sideways**	**Jack Cole**
2004	Joseph Fiennes	The Merchant of Venice	Bassanio
2004	Jeremy Irons	Being Julia	Michael Gosselyn
2004	Peter Sarsgaard	Garden State	Mark
2004	Mark Wahlberg	I Heart Huckabees	Tommy Corn
2004	Patrick Wilson	The Phantom of the Opera	Viscount Raoul de Chagny
2005	**Val Kilmer**	**Kiss Kiss Bang Bang**	**"Gay" Perry van Shrike**
2005	Tom Arnold	Happy Endings	Frank McKee
2005	Corbin Bernsen	Kiss Kiss Bang Bang	Harlan Dexter
2005	Steve Coogan	Happy Endings	Charley Peppitone
2005	Craig T. Nelson	The Family Stone	Kelly Stone
2005	Jason Schwartzman	Shopgirl	Jeremy

=== Motion Picture ===
Year	Actor	Film	Role
2006	**Leonardo DiCaprio**	**The Departed**	**William "Billy" Costigan, Jr.**
2006	Alan Arkin	Little Miss Sunshine	Edwin Hoover
2006	Adam Beach	Flags of Our Fathers	Ira Hayes
2006	Jack Nicholson	The Departed	Frank Costello
2006	Brad Pitt	Babel	Richard Jones
2006	Donald Sutherland	Aurora Borealis	Ronald Shorter
2007	**Casey Affleck**	**The Assassination of Jesse James** **by the Coward Robert Ford**	**Robert Ford**
2007	**Tom Wilkinson**	**Michael Clayton**	**Arthur Edens**
2007	Javier Bardem	No Country for Old Men	Anton Chigurh
2007	Brian Cox	Zodiac	Melvin Belli
2007	Jeff Daniels	The Lookout	Lewis
2007	Ben Foster	3:10 to Yuma	Charlie Prince
2008	**Michael Shannon**	**Revolutionary Road**	**John Givings, Jr.**
2008	Robert Downey Jr.	Tropic Thunder	Kirk Lazarus
2008	James Franco	Milk	Scott Smith
2008	Philip Seymour Hoffman	Doubt	Father Brendan Flynn
2008	Heath Ledger (posthumous)	The Dark Knight	The Joker
2008	Rade Šerbedžija	Fugitive Pieces	Athos
2009	**Christoph Waltz**	**Inglourious Basterds**	**Col. Hans Landa**
2009	Woody Harrelson	The Messenger	Capt. Tony Stone
2009	James McAvoy	The Last Station	Valentin Bulgakov
2009	Alfred Molina	An Education	Jack Miller
2009	Timothy Spall	The Damned United	Peter Taylor
2010	**Christian Bale**	**The Fighter**	**Dicky Eklund**
2010	Pierce Brosnan	The Ghost Writer	Adam Lang
2010	Andrew Garfield	The Social Network	Eduardo Saverin
2010	Tommy Lee Jones	The Company Men	Gene McClary
2010	Bill Murray	Get Low	Frank Quinn
2010	Sean Penn	Fair Game	Joseph C. Wilson
2010	Jeremy Renner	The Town	James "Jem" Coughlin
2010	Geoffrey Rush	The King's Speech	Lionel Logue
2011	**Albert Brooks**	**Drive**	**Bernie Rose**
2011	Kenneth Branagh	My Week with Marilyn	Laurence Olivier
2011	Colin Farrell	Horrible Bosses	Bobby Pellitt
2011	Jonah Hill	Moneyball	Peter Brand
2011	Viggo Mortensen	A Dangerous Method	Sigmund Freud
2011	Nick Nolte	Warrior	Paddy Conlon
2011	Christopher Plummer	Beginners	Hal Fields
2011	Andy Serkis	Rise of the Planet of the Apes	Caesar
2011	Christoph Waltz	Carnage	Alan Cowan
2011	Hugo Weaving	Oranges and Sunshine	Jack
2012	**Javier Bardem**	**Skyfall**	**Raoul Silva**
2012	Robert De Niro	Silver Linings Playbook	Patrizio "Pat" Solitano, Sr.
2012	John Goodman	Flight	Harling Mays
2012	Philip Seymour Hoffman	The Master	Lancaster Dodd
2012	Tommy Lee Jones	Lincoln	Thaddeus Stevens
2012	Eddie Redmayne	Les Misérables	Marius Pontmercy
2013	**Jared Leto**	**Dallas Buyers Club**	**Rayon**
2013	Casey Affleck	Out of the Furnace	Rodney Baze, Jr.
2013	Bradley Cooper	American Hustle	Richie DiMaso
2013	Michael Fassbender	12 Years a Slave	Edwin Epps
2013	Harrison Ford	42	Branch Rickey
2013	Ryan Gosling	The Place Beyond the Pines	Luke Glanton
2013	Jake Gyllenhaal	Prisoners	Detective Loki
2013	Tom Hanks	Saving Mr. Banks	Walt Disney
2014	**J. K. Simmons**	**Whiplash**	**Terence Fletcher**
2014	Robert Duvall	The Judge	Judge Joseph Palmer
2014	Ethan Hawke	Boyhood	Mason Evans, Sr.
2014	Edward Norton	Birdman	Mike Shiner
2014	Mark Ruffalo	Foxcatcher	Dave Schultz
2014	Andy Serkis	Dawn of the Planet of the Apes	Caesar
2015	**Christian Bale**	**The Big Short**	**Michael Burry**
2015	Paul Dano	Love & Mercy	Brian Wilson
2015	Benicio del Toro	Sicario	Alejandro Gillick
2015	Michael Keaton	Spotlight	Walter "Robby" Robinson
2015	Mark Ruffalo	Spotlight	Michael Rezendes
2015	Sylvester Stallone	Creed	Rocky Balboa
2016	**Jeff Bridges**	**Hell or High Water**	**Marcus Hamilton**
2016	Mahershala Ali	Moonlight	Juan
2016	Hugh Grant	Florence Foster Jenkins	St. Clair Bayfield
2016	Lucas Hedges	Manchester by the Sea	Patrick Chandler
2016	Eddie Murphy	Mr. Church	Henry Joseph Church
2016	Dev Patel	Lion	Saroo Brierley
2017	**Sam Rockwell**	**Three Billboards Outside Ebbing, Missouri**	**Officer Jason Dixon**
2017	Willem Dafoe	The Florida Project	Bobby Hicks
2017	Armie Hammer	Call Me by Your Name	Oliver
2017	Dustin Hoffman	The Meyerowitz Stories	Harold Meyerowitz
2017	Mark Rylance	Dunkirk	Mr. Dawson
2017	Michael Shannon	The Shape of Water	Colonel Richard Strickland
2018	**Richard E. Grant**	**Can You Ever Forgive Me?**	**Jack Hock**
2018	Mahershala Ali	Green Book	Don Shirley
2018	Timothée Chalamet	Beautiful Boy	Nic Sheff
2018	Russell Crowe	Boy Erased	Marshall Eamons
2018	Adam Driver	BlacKkKlansman	Detective Flip Zimmerman
2018	Sam Elliott	A Star Is Born	Bobby Maine
2019	**Willem Dafoe**	**The Lighthouse**	**Thomas Wake**
2019	Tom Hanks	A Beautiful Day in the Neighborhood	Fred Rogers
2019	Anthony Hopkins	The Two Popes	Pope Benedict XVI
2019	Joe Pesci	The Irishman	Russell Bufalino
2019	Wendell Pierce	Burning Cane	Reverend Tillman
2019	Brad Pitt	Once Upon a Time in Hollywood	Cliff Booth
2020	**Chadwick Boseman** (posthumous)	**Da 5 Bloods**	**Norman Earl "Stormin' Norman" Holloway**
2020	Sacha Baron Cohen	The Trial of the Chicago 7	Abbie Hoffman
2020	Kingsley Ben-Adir	One Night in Miami...	Malcolm X
2020	Brian Dennehy	Driveways	Del
2020	Bill Murray	On the Rocks	Felix Keane
2020	David Strathairn	Nomadland	David
2021	**Kodi Smit-McPhee**	**The Power of the Dog**	**Peter Gordon**
2021	Robin de Jesús	tick, tick... BOOM!	Michael
2021	Jamie Dornan	Belfast	Pa
2021	Ciarán Hinds	Belfast	Pop
2021	Jared Leto	House of Gucci	Paolo Gucci
2021	J. K. Simmons	Being the Ricardos	William Frawley
2022
2022	**Ke Huy Quan**	**Everything Everywhere All at Once**	**Waymond Wang**
2022	Paul Dano	The Fabelmans	Burt Fabelman
2022	Brendan Gleeson	The Banshees of Inisherin	Colm Doherty
2022	Eddie Redmayne	The Good Nurse	Charles Cullen
2022	Jeremy Strong	Armageddon Time	Irving Graff
2022	Ben Whishaw	Women Talking	August Epp
2023
2023	**Mark Ruffalo**	**Poor Things**	**Duncan Wedderburn**
2023	Robert De Niro	Killers of the Flower Moon	William King Hale
2023	Robert Downey Jr.	Oppenheimer	Lewis Strauss
2023	Ryan Gosling	Barbie	Ken
2023	Charles Melton	May December	Joe Yoo
2023	Dominic Sessa	The Holdovers	Angus Tully
2024	**Guy Pearce**	**The Brutalist**	**Harrison Lee Van Buren**
2024	Yura Borisov	Anora	Igor
2024	Kieran Culkin	A Real Pain	Benji Kaplan
2024	Clarence Maclin	Sing Sing	Himself
2024	Edward Norton	A Complete Unknown	Pete Seeger
2024	Denzel Washington	Gladiator II	Macrinus
2025	**Stellan Skarsgård**	**Sentimental Value**	**Gustov Borg**
2025	Benicio del Toro	One Battle After Another	Sensei Sergio St. Carlos
2025	Jacob Elordi	Frankenstein	The Creature
2025	Paul Mescal	Hamnet	William Shakespeare
2025	Sean Penn	One Battle After Another	Col. Steven J. Lockjaw

== See also ==
- Academy Award for Best Supporting Actor
- Independent Spirit Award for Best Supporting Male
