= 10th Critics' Choice Awards =

2005 US film awards

- Date: January 10, 2005
- Site: The Wiltern; Los Angeles, California
- Hosted by: Eric McCormack
- Official website: www.criticschoice.com

Highlights
- Best Film: Sideways

Television coverage
- Network: The WB

The 10th Critics' Choice Awards were presented on January 10, 2005, at The Wiltern in Los Angeles, California, honoring the finest achievements of 2004 filmmaking. The ceremony was hosted by Eric McCormack and broadcast live on The WB. The nominees were announced on December 15, 2004.

== Top 10 films ==
(in alphabetical order)

- The Aviator
- Collateral
- Eternal Sunshine of the Spotless Mind
- Finding Neverland
- Hotel Rwanda
- Kinsey
- Million Dollar Baby
- The Phantom of the Opera
- Ray
- Sideways

== Winners and nominees ==
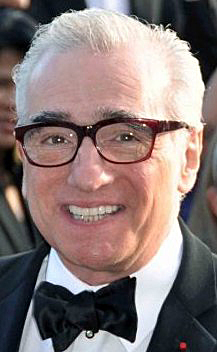
Martin Scorsese, Best Director winner

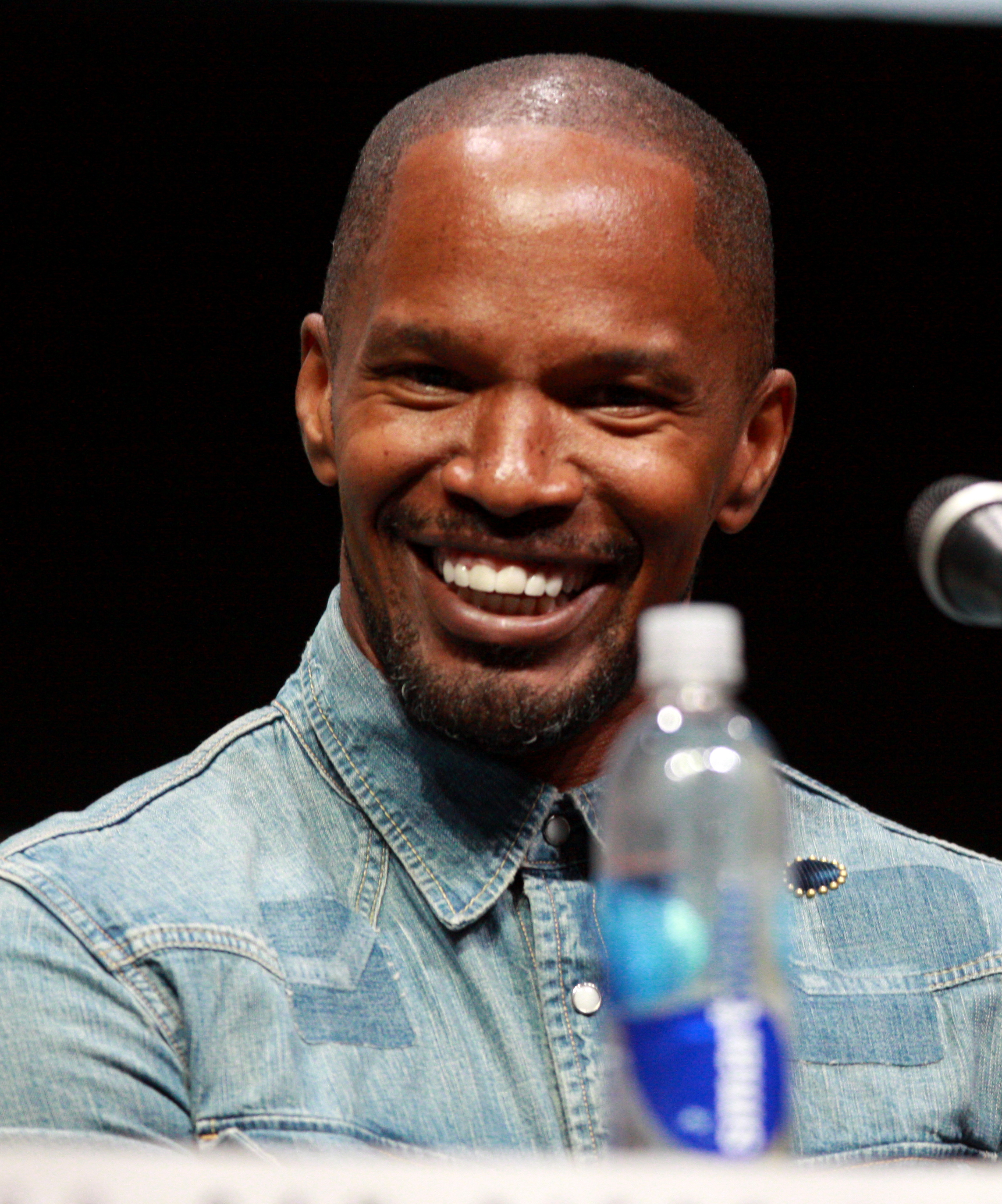
Jamie Foxx, Best Actor winner

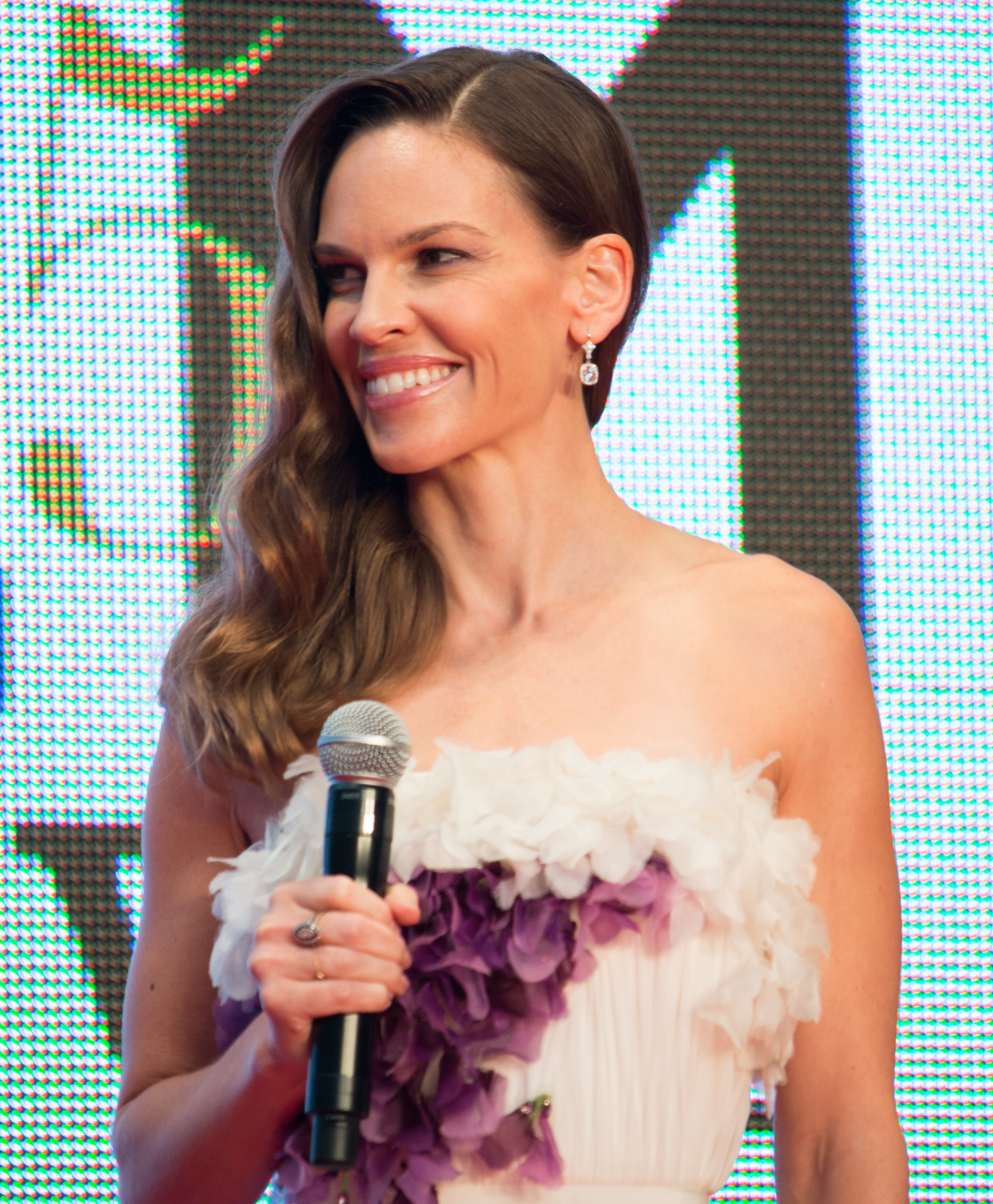
Hilary Swank, Best Actress winner

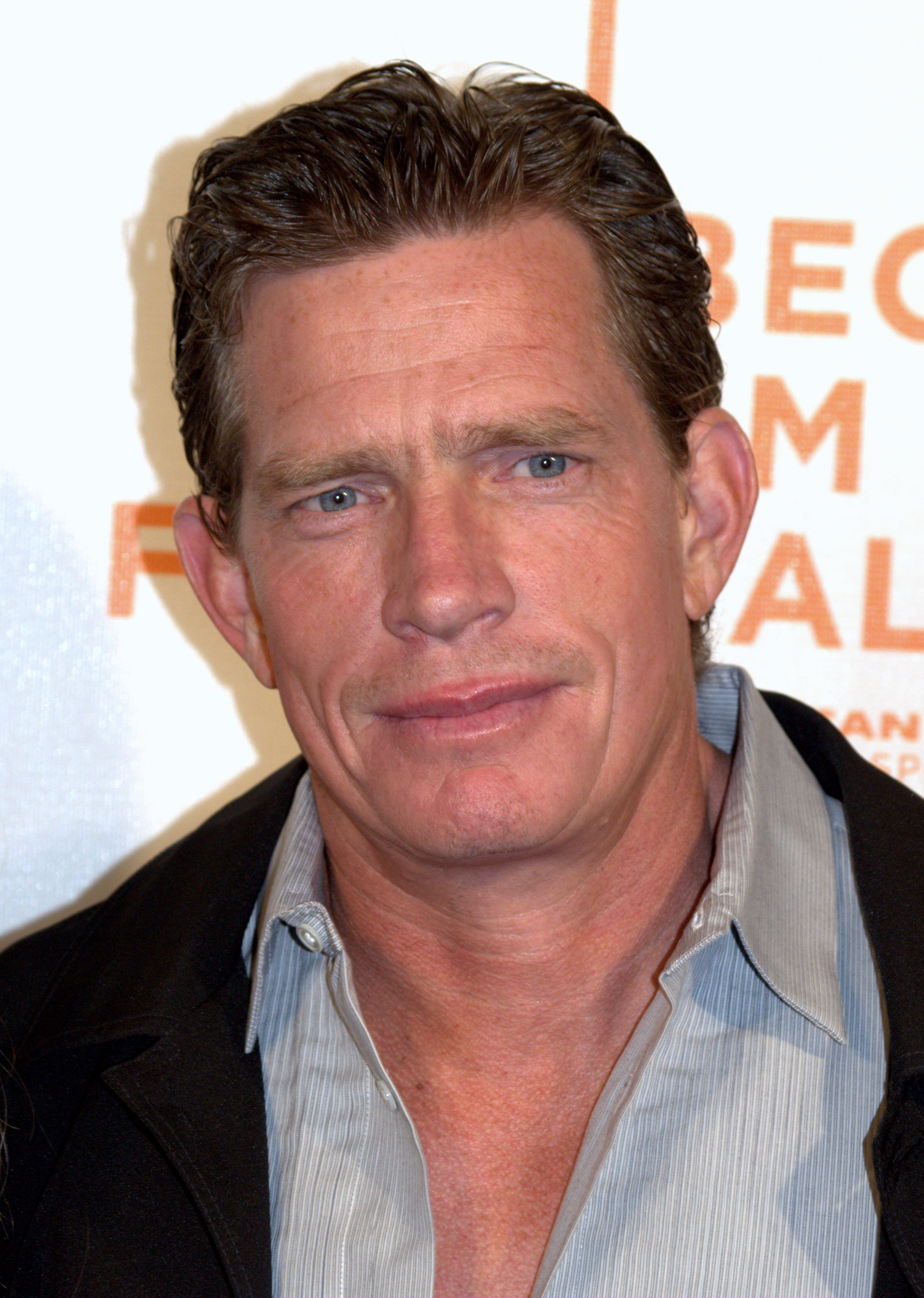
Thomas Haden Church, Best Supporting Actor winner

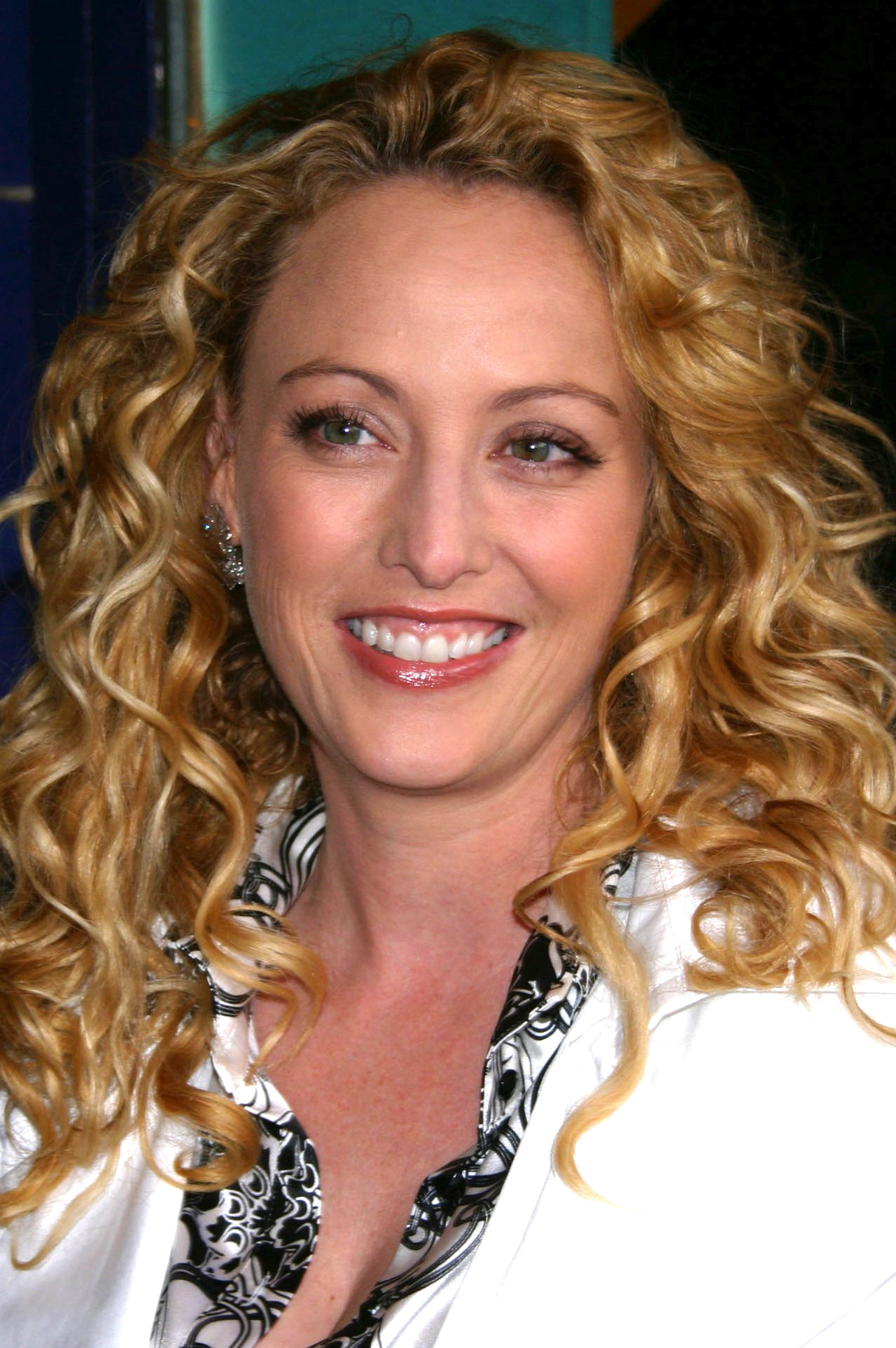
Virginia Madsen, Best Supporting Actress winner

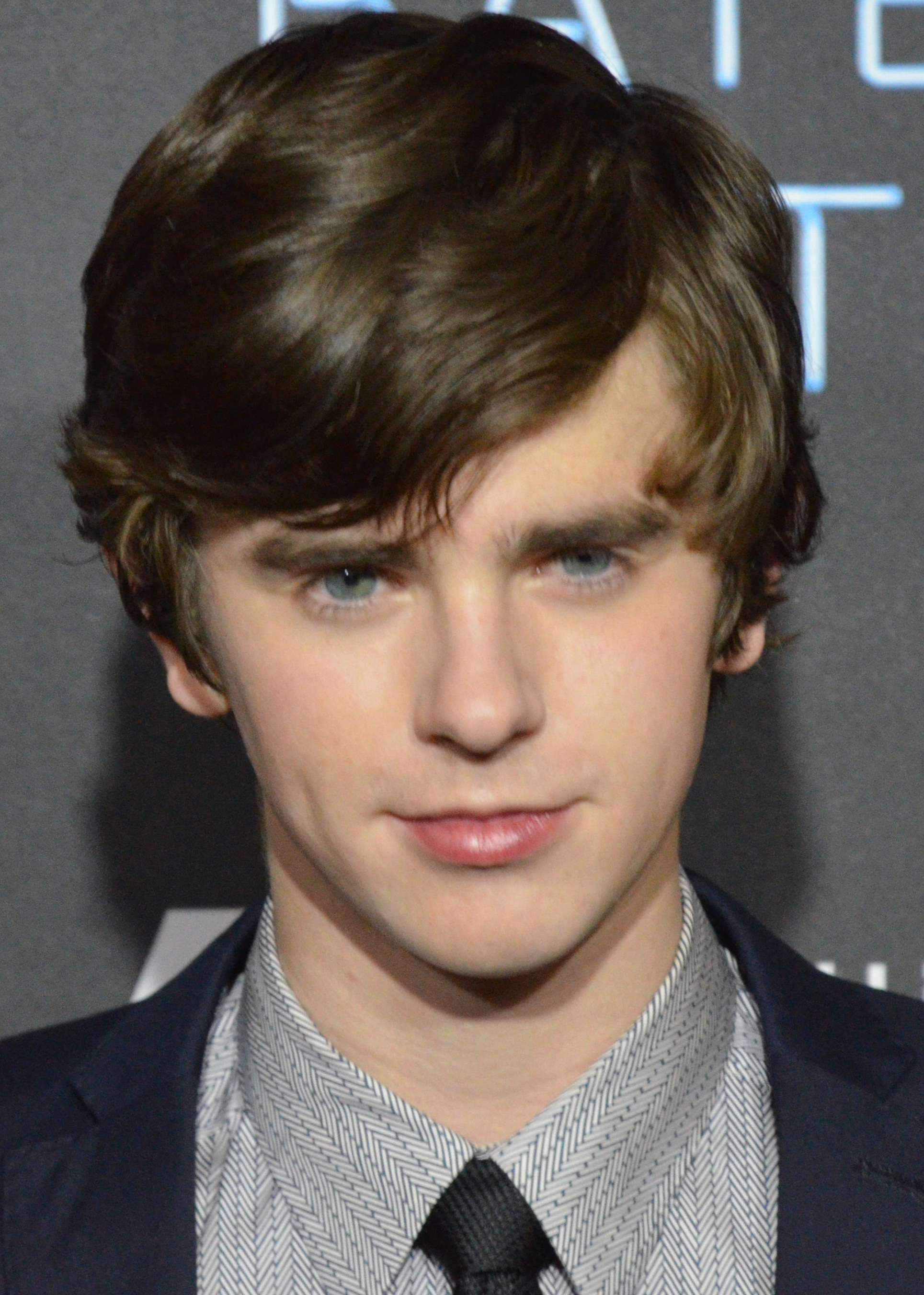
Freddie Highmore, Best Young Actor winner

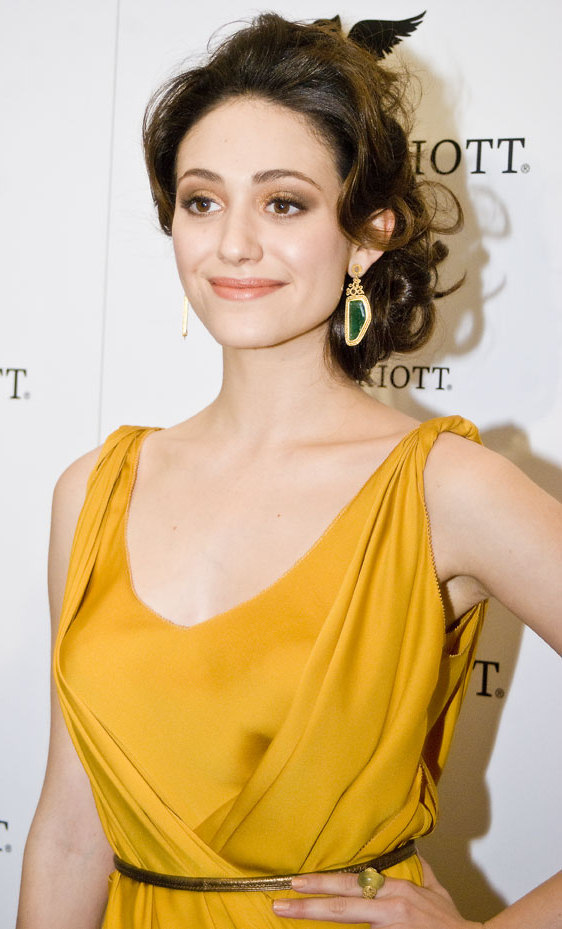
Emmy Rossum, Best Young Actress winner

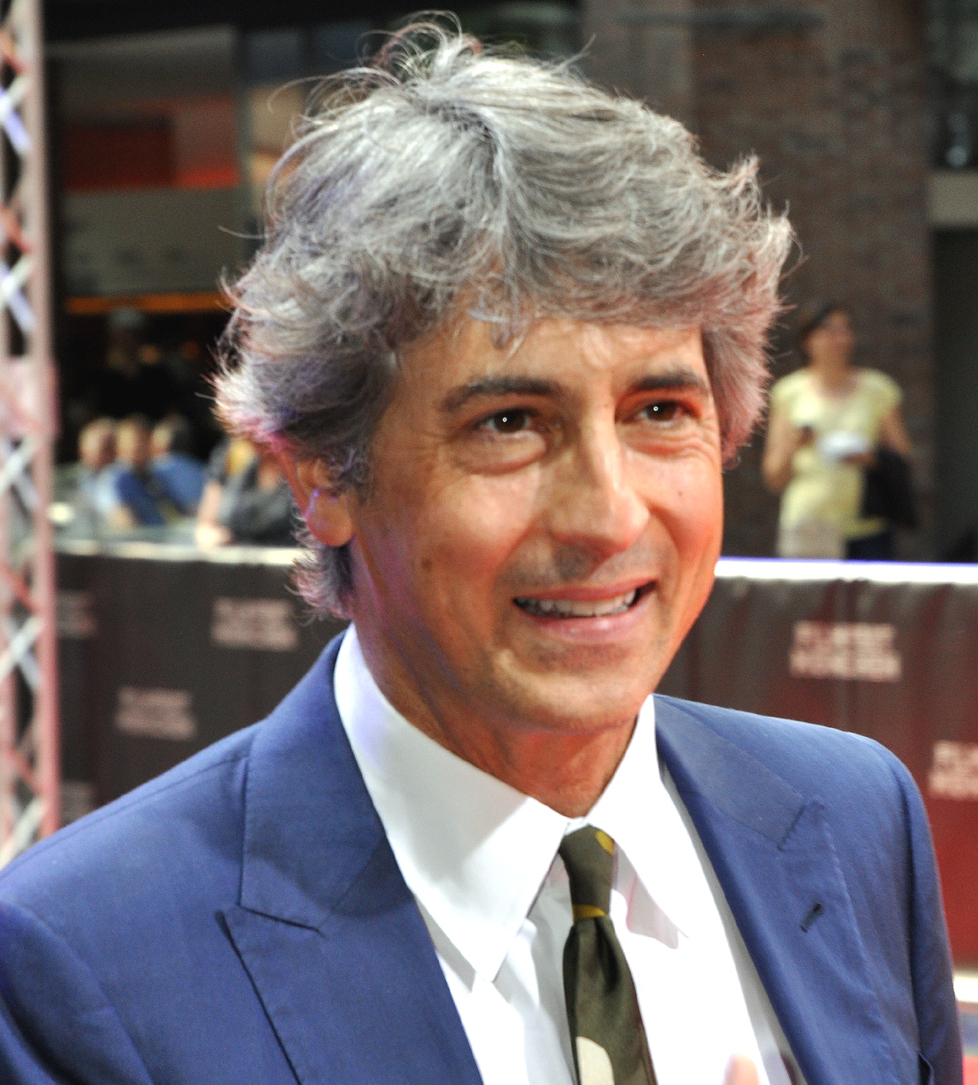
Alexander Payne, Best Writer co-winner

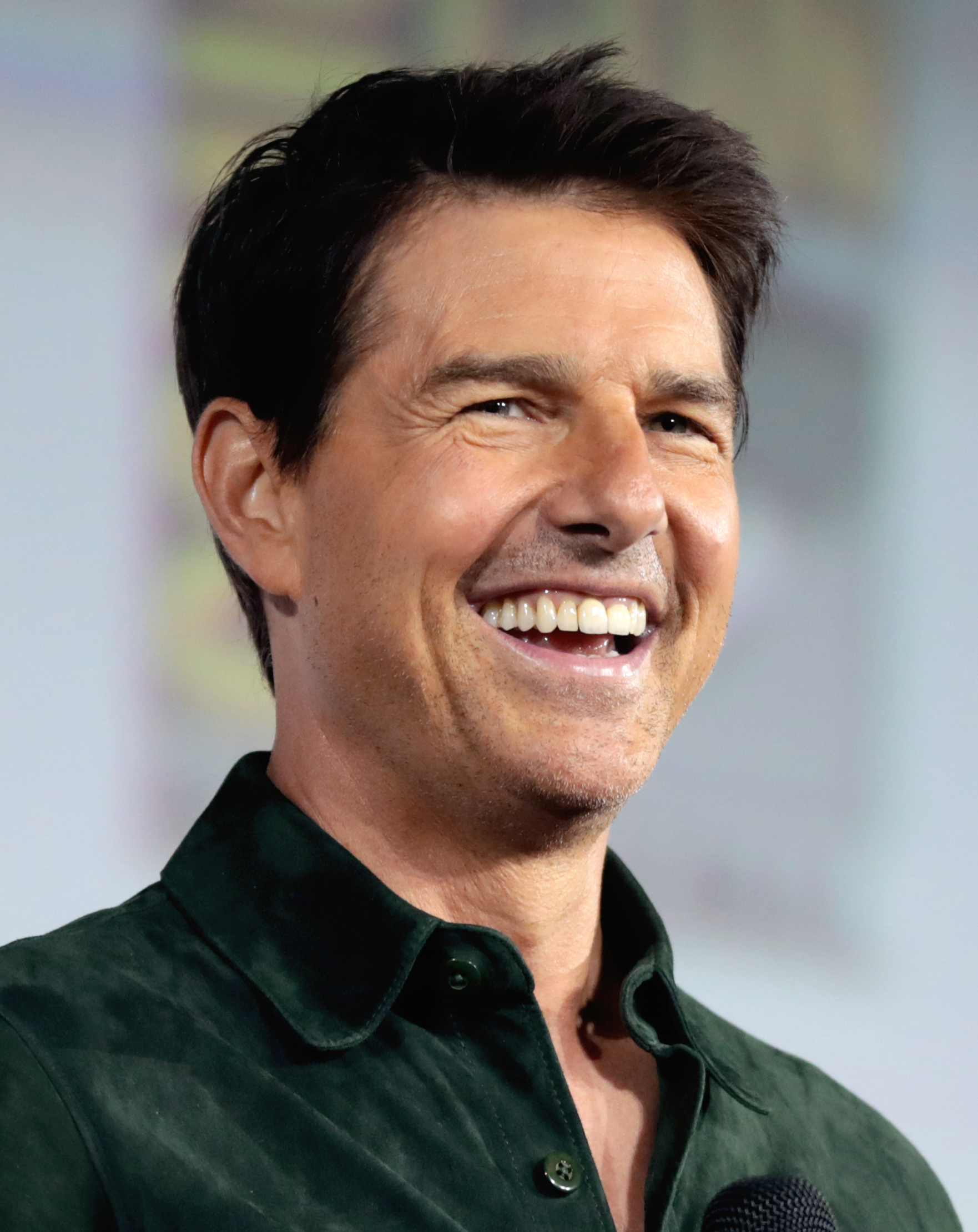
Tom Cruise, Distinguished Career Achievement in Performing Arts Award winner

Best Picture Sideways: The Aviator; Collateral; Eternal Sunshine of the Spotless Mind; Finding Neverland; Hotel Rwanda; Kinsey; Million Dollar Baby; The Phantom of the Opera; Ray	Best Director Martin Scorsese – The Aviator: Clint Eastwood – Million Dollar Baby; Marc Forster – Finding Neverland; Taylor Hackford – Ray; Alexander Payne – Sideways
Best Actor Jamie Foxx – Ray as Ray Charles: Javier Bardem – The Sea Inside as Ramón Sampedro; Don Cheadle – Hotel Rwanda as Paul Rusesabagina; Johnny Depp – Finding Neverland as J. M. Barrie; Leonardo DiCaprio – The Aviator as Howard Hughes; Paul Giamatti – Sideways as Miles Raymond	Best Actress Hilary Swank – Million Dollar Baby as Maggie Fitzgerald: Annette Bening – Being Julia as Julia Lambert; Catalina Sandino Moreno – Maria Full of Grace as Maria Álvarez; Imelda Staunton – Vera Drake as Vera Drake; Uma Thurman – Kill Bill: Volume 2 as Beatrix Kiddo; Kate Winslet – Eternal Sunshine of the Spotless Mind as Clementine Kruczynski
Best Supporting Actor Thomas Haden Church – Sideways as Jack Cole: Jamie Foxx – Collateral as Max Durocher; Morgan Freeman – Million Dollar Baby as Eddie "Scrap-Iron" Dupris; Clive Owen – Closer as Larry Gray; Peter Sarsgaard – Kinsey as Clyde Martin	Best Supporting Actress Virginia Madsen – Sideways as Maya Randall: Cate Blanchett – The Aviator as Katharine Hepburn; Laura Linney – Kinsey as Clara McMillen; Natalie Portman – Closer as Alice Ayres / Jane Jones; Kate Winslet – Finding Neverland as Sylvia Llewelyn Davies
Best Young Actor Freddie Highmore – Finding Neverland as Peter Llewelyn Davies: Liam Aiken – Lemony Snicket's A Series of Unfortunate Events as Klaus Baudelaire; Cameron Bright – Birth as Young Sean; Daniel Radcliffe – Harry Potter and the Prisoner of Azkaban as Harry Potter; William Ullrich – Beyond the Sea as Little Bobby	Best Young Actress Emmy Rossum – The Phantom of the Opera as Christine Daaé: Emily Browning – Lemony Snicket's A Series of Unfortunate Events as Violet Baudelaire; Dakota Fanning – Man on Fire as Lupita Ramos; Lindsay Lohan – Mean Girls as Cady Heron; Emma Watson – Harry Potter and the Prisoner of Azkaban as Hermione Granger
Best Acting Ensemble Sideways: Closer; The Life Aquatic with Steve Zissou; Ocean's Twelve	Best Writer Sideways – Alexander Payne and Jim Taylor: The Aviator – John Logan; Eternal Sunshine of the Spotless Mind – Charlie Kaufman; Finding Neverland – David Magee; Kinsey – Bill Condon
Best Animated Feature The Incredibles: The Polar Express; Shrek 2	Best Documentary Feature Fahrenheit 9/11: Control Room; Metallica: Some Kind of Monster; Super Size Me
Best Family Film Finding Neverland: Harry Potter and the Prisoner of Azkaban; Lemony Snicket's A Series of Unfortunate Events; Miracle; Spider-Man 2	Best Foreign Language Film The Sea Inside • France / Italy / Spain: House of Flying Daggers • China / Hong Kong; Maria Full of Grace • Colombia / USA; The Motorcycle Diaries • Argentina / Brazil / Chile / France / Germany / Peru / UK / USA; A Very Long Engagement • France / USA
Best Composer The Aviator – Howard Shore: The Incredibles – Michael Giacchino; Sideways – Rolfe Kent	Best Song "Old Habits Die Hard" – Alfie: "Accidentally in Love" – Shrek 2; "Believe" – The Polar Express
Best Popular Film Spider-Man 2: The Bourne Supremacy; The Incredibles; Napoleon Dynamite; The Passion of the Christ	Best Soundtrack Ray: Alfie; Beyond the Sea; De-Lovely; Garden State

=== Best Picture Made for Television ===
The Life and Death of Peter Sellers

- The Five People You Meet in Heaven
- Something the Lord Made
- The Wool Cap

=== Distinguished Career Achievement in Performing Arts Award ===
Tom Cruise

== Statistics ==
Nominations	Film
8	Sideways
7	Finding Neverland
6	The Aviator
4	Kinsey
4	Million Dollar Baby
4	Ray
3	Eternal Sunshine of the Spotless Mind
3	Harry Potter and the Prisoner of Azkaban
3	The Incredibles
3	Lemony Snicket's A Series of Unfortunate Events
2	Alfie
2	Beyond the Sea
2	Closer
2	Collateral
2	Hotel Rwanda
2	Maria Full of Grace
2	The Phantom of the Opera
2	The Polar Express
2	The Sea Inside
2	Shrek 2
2	Spider-Man 2

Wins	Film
5	Sideways
2	The Aviator
2	Finding Neverland
2	Ray
