= Paul Gebhard =

American anthropologist and sexologist (1917–2015)

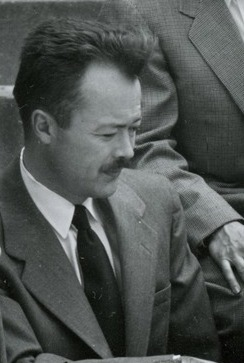
- Gebhard in 1953
- Born: Paul Henry Gebhard Jr. July 3, 1917; Rocky Ford, Colorado, U.S.
- Died: July 9, 2015 (aged 98); Indiana. U.S.
- Occupations: Anthropologist, sexologist
- Spouses: Agnes West (divorced) Joan Huntington (died 2004)
- Children: 3 (and 2 stepchildren)

Academic background
- Education: Harvard University (BS, PhD)
- Influences: Alfred Kinsey

Academic work
- Institutions: Institute for Sex Research; Indiana University Bloomington
- Notable works: Sexual Behavior in the Human Female (1953, co-author)

Paul Henry Gebhard Jr. (July 3, 1917 – July 9, 2015) was an American anthropologist and sexologist. Born in Rocky Ford, Colorado, he earned a BS and a PhD from Harvard in 1940 and 1947, respectively. Between the years 1946 and 1956, Gebhard was a close colleague to sex researcher Alfred Kinsey. It was acknowledged in Gebhard's New York Times obituary that Kinsey was in fact his mentor and that Gebhard was fascinated when Kinsey first met him and revealed to him that the men's room at Grand Central Terminal in New York City was a frequent site for gay cruising.

Following Kinsey's death in 1956, Gebhard became the second director of the Kinsey Institute and served in that capacity from 1956 to 1982. In 1953, Gebhard co-authored the second of the two Kinsey Reports, which is known as "Sexual Behavior in the Human Female". He has also claimed that the statistical bias in the data had not materially affected the results of either of the two reports. He joined the Department of Anthropology of Indiana University in 1947, and retired in 1986.

== Biography ==
Gebhard was born on July 3, 1917, in Rocky Ford, Colorado, to Paul Gebhard Sr. and Eva Baker, who worked as an elementary schoolteacher. He married and later divorced Agnes West, and was married to Joan Huntington until her death in 2004. Following a brief illness, Gebhard died near his home in Indiana on July 9, 2015, aged 98. He was survived by three children of his first marriage and two stepchildren from his second.

== Major works ==
- Sexual Behavior in the Human Female (1953, co-author)
- Pregnancy, Birth and Abortion (1958)
- The Kinsey Data: Marginal Tabulations of the 1938-1963 Interviews Conducted by the Institute for Sex Research (1979)

== In the media ==
In the 2004 film Kinsey, actor Timothy Hutton stars as Gebhard.
