= Clara McMillen Kinsey =

American scientist

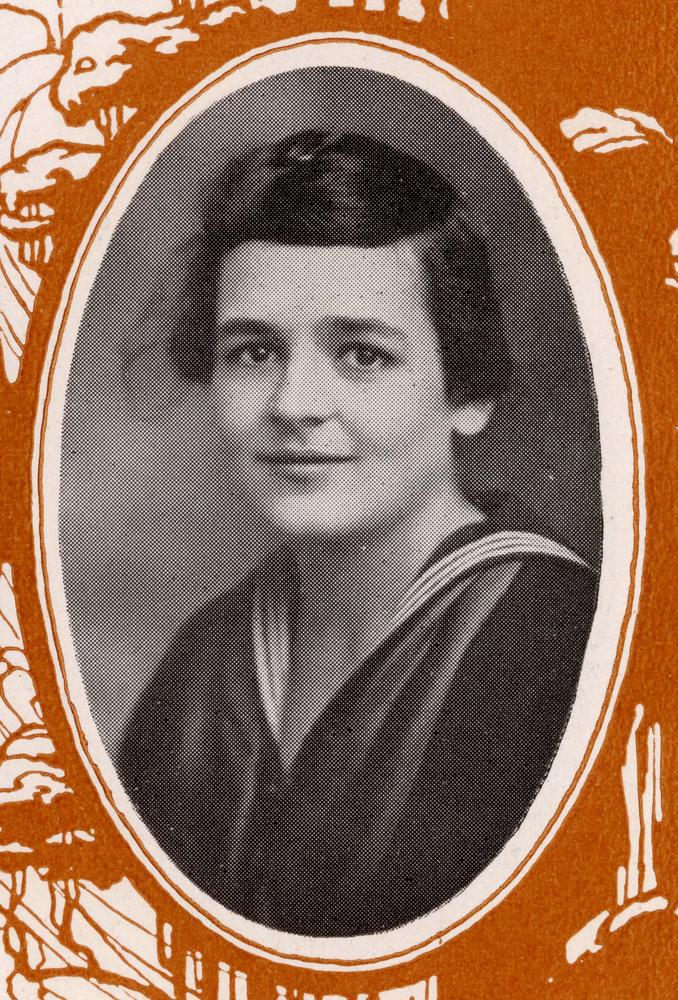
- 1921 Yearbook Photo
- Born: 2 October 1898; Bloomington, Indiana, U.S.
- Died: April 30, 1982 (aged 83); Bloomington, Indiana, U.S.
- Occupations: Biologist, sexologist
- Known for: Zoology, entomology
- Spouse: Alfred Kinsey (m. 1921; died 1956)
- Children: 4

Clara McMillen Kinsey, born Clara Bracken McMillen, (October 2, 1898 – April 30, 1982) was an American researcher. The wife of Alfred Kinsey, whose nickname for her was "Mac", she contributed to the Kinsey Reports on human sexuality.

== Life and career ==
Born in Bloomington, Indiana, the only child of Josephine (née Bracken) and William Lincoln McMillen. She enjoyed a middle class upbringing, growing up in Brookville, Indiana. Her father was an English professor and her mother studied music but gave up her career once her daughter was born. Clara described her parents as 'in-active Protestants'. She excelled at sports as a teenager, including swimming. She attended Fort Wayne Public High School. In 1924, tragedy struck and her father died of pneumonia, then her mother died six months later.

In 1917, she enrolled to study chemistry at Indiana University, graduating with Phi Beta Kappa, Sigma Xi, and other honors. She also attended graduate school which she eventually left after marrying Alfred Kinsey. She first met him briefly when he visited Indiana University before joining the faculty and they met again at a zoology department picnic in 1920. The couple were married from 3 June 1921 until Alfred's death in 1956. Alfred was bisexual and polyamorous. Clara and Kinsey had an open relationship in addition to their intimacy together. Clara also slept with other men, and Kinsey slept with other men, including his student Clyde Martin. Over the years, she supported and contributed to her husband's work and legacy.

Alfred and Clara had four children: Donald (1922–1927), Anne (1924–2016), Joan (1925–2009), and Bruce (1928–2021). Donald died of diabetes shortly before his fifth birthday. Alfred died in 1956.

== Death ==
Clara McMillen Kinsey died on April 30, 1982, in Bloomington, Indiana at the age of 83. She is buried with her husband.

== Portrayal in media ==
Laura Linney was nominated for the Academy Award for Best Supporting Actress for her portrayal of Clara McMillen in the 2004 film Kinsey.
