= Alfred Kinsey =

American scientist (1894–1956)

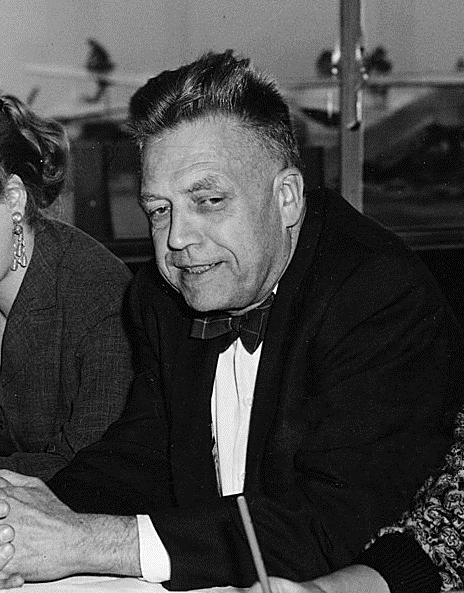
- Kinsey in Frankfurt, November 1955
- Born: Alfred Charles Kinsey; June 23, 1894; Hoboken, New Jersey, U.S.
- Died: August 25, 1956 (aged 62); Bloomington, Indiana, U.S.
- Education: Bowdoin College; Harvard University (ScD)
- Known for: Sexology and human sexuality; Kinsey Reports; Kinsey scale; Kinsey Institute
- Spouse: Clara McMillen (m. 1921)
- Children: 4
- Scientific career
- Fields: Biology
- Workplaces: Indiana University Bloomington

Alfred Charles Kinsey (/ˈkɪnzi/; June 23, 1894 – August 25, 1956) was an American sexologist, biologist, and professor of entomology and zoology who, in 1947, founded the Institute for Sex Research at Indiana University, now known as the Kinsey Institute for Research in Sex, Gender, and Reproduction. He is best known for writing Sexual Behavior in the Human Male (1948) and Sexual Behavior in the Human Female (1953), also known as the Kinsey Reports, as well as for the Kinsey scale. Kinsey's research on human sexuality, foundational to the field of sexology, provoked controversy in the 1940s and 1950s, and has continued to provoke controversy decades after his death. His work has influenced social and cultural values in the United States and United Kingdom as well as internationally.

== Early life and education ==
Alfred Kinsey was born on June 23, 1894, in Hoboken, New Jersey, the son of Sarah Ann (née Charles) and Alfred Seguine Kinsey. He was the eldest of three children. His mother received little formal education; his father was a professor at Stevens Institute of Technology.

Kinsey's parents were devout Christians. His father was known as one of the most devout members of the local Methodist church. Most of Kinsey's social interactions were with other members of the church, often as a silent observer, while his parents discussed religion. Kinsey's father imposed strict rules on the household, including mandating Sunday as a day of prayer and little else.

Kinsey's parents were poor for most of his childhood, often unable to afford proper medical care. This may have led to a young Kinsey receiving inadequate treatment for a variety of diseases including rickets, rheumatic fever, and typhoid fever. His health records indicate that Kinsey received suboptimal exposure to sunlight (often the cause of rickets, before milk and other foods were fortified with vitamin D) and lived in unsanitary conditions for at least part of his childhood. Rickets led to a curvature of the spine, which resulted in a slight stoop that prevented Kinsey from being drafted in 1917 for World War I.

At age 10, Kinsey moved with his family to South Orange, New Jersey. Also at a young age, he showed great interest in nature and camping. He worked and camped with the local YMCA throughout his early years, and enjoyed these activities to such an extent that he intended to work for the YMCA after completing his education. Kinsey's senior undergraduate thesis for psychology, a dissertation on the group dynamics of young boys, echoed this interest. He joined the Boy Scouts when a troop was formed in his community. His parents strongly supported this (and joined as well) because the Boy Scouts was an organization that was based on the principles of Christianity. Kinsey worked his way up through the Scouting ranks to earn Eagle Scout in 1913, making him one of the earliest Eagle Scouts. Despite earlier disease having weakened his heart, Kinsey followed an intense sequence of difficult hikes and camping expeditions throughout his early life.

In high school, Kinsey was a quiet but hard-working student. While attending Columbia High School, he devoted his energy to academic work and playing the piano. At one time, Kinsey had hoped to become a concert pianist, but decided to concentrate on his scientific pursuits instead. Kinsey's ability to spend immense amounts of time deeply focused on study was a trait that would serve him well in college and during his professional career. He seems not to have formed strong social relationships during high school, but earned respect for his academic ability. While there, Kinsey became interested in biology, botany and zoology. Kinsey was later to claim that his high school biology teacher, Natalie Roeth, was the most important influence on his decision to become a scientist.

Kinsey approached his father with plans to study botany at college. His father demanded that he study engineering at Stevens Institute of Technology instead. At Stevens, he primarily took courses related to English and engineering, but was unable to satisfy his interest in biology. Kinsey was not successful there, and decided engineering was not a field at which he could excel. At the end of two years at Stevens, Kinsey gathered the courage to confront his father about his interest in biology and his intent to continue studying at Bowdoin College in Brunswick, Maine, where he majored in biology.

== Initial research on entomology ==
In the fall of 1914, Kinsey entered Bowdoin College, where he studied entomology under Manton Copeland, and was admitted to the Zeta Psi fraternity, in whose house he lived for much of his time at college. In 1916 Kinsey was elected to the Phi Beta Kappa society and graduated magna cum laude, with degrees in biology and psychology. Alfred Seguine Kinsey did not attend his son's graduation ceremony at Bowdoin, possibly as another sign of disapproval of his son's choice of career and studies.

Kinsey continued his graduate studies at Harvard University's Bussey Institute, which had one of the most highly regarded biology programs in the United States. It was there that Kinsey studied applied biology under William Morton Wheeler, a scientist who made outstanding contributions to entomology. Under Wheeler, Kinsey worked almost completely autonomously, which suited both men quite well.

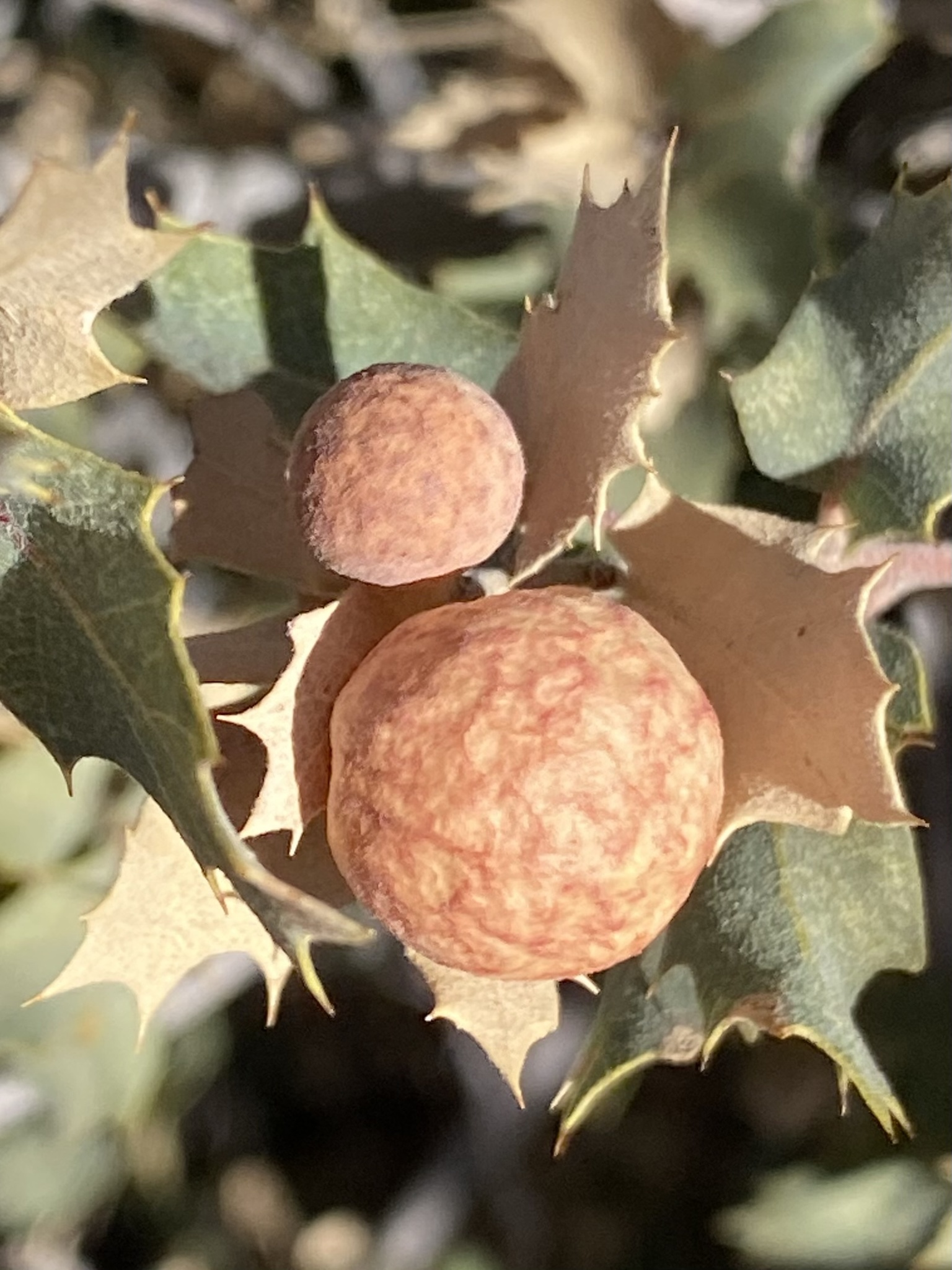
Oak-apple galls induced by Atrusca brevipennata, one of the wasp species first described by Kinsey

Kinsey wrote his doctoral thesis on gall wasps, zealously collecting samples of the species. He traveled widely and took 26 detailed measurements of hundreds of thousands of gall wasps; his methodology was itself an important contribution to entomology as a science. In 1919, Kinsey was awarded an Sc.D from Harvard University, and he accepted an academic post in biology at Indiana University. In 1920 he published several papers under the auspices of the American Museum of Natural History in New York City, introducing the gall wasp to the scientific community and describing its phylogeny. Of the more than 18 million insects in the museum's collection, some 5 million are gall wasps collected by Kinsey.

Kinsey wrote a widely used high-school textbook, An Introduction to Biology, which was published in October 1926. The book endorsed evolution and unified, at the introductory level, the previously separate fields of zoology and botany.

An Introduction to Biology was unlike any other textbook on the market ... Kinsey's textbook was noteworthy for the strong position it took on evolution ... In his textbook Kinsey laid out the basic facts of evolution in a manner-of-fact matter, as though he were discussing the life cycle of the fruit fly. ... The chapter called "Further Evidence of Change" was especially blunt ... Kinsey defined evolution as "the scientific word for change", and while he acknowledged that there are some people who "think they don't believe in evolution", he tried to show his students the folly of such reasoning. To find proof of evolution, students had only to look at things they used daily ... Kinsey ridiculed the man who denounced evolution but owned a new breed of dog or smoked a cigar made from a recently improved variety of tobacco, saying, "When he says he doesn't believe in evolution, I wonder what he means."

Kinsey co-authored Edible Wild Plants of Eastern North America, published in 1943, with Merritt Lyndon Fernald. The original draft of the book was written in 1919–1920, while Kinsey was still a doctoral student at the Bussey Institute, and Fernald was working at the Arnold Arboretum.

== Sexology ==
=== The Kinsey Reports ===
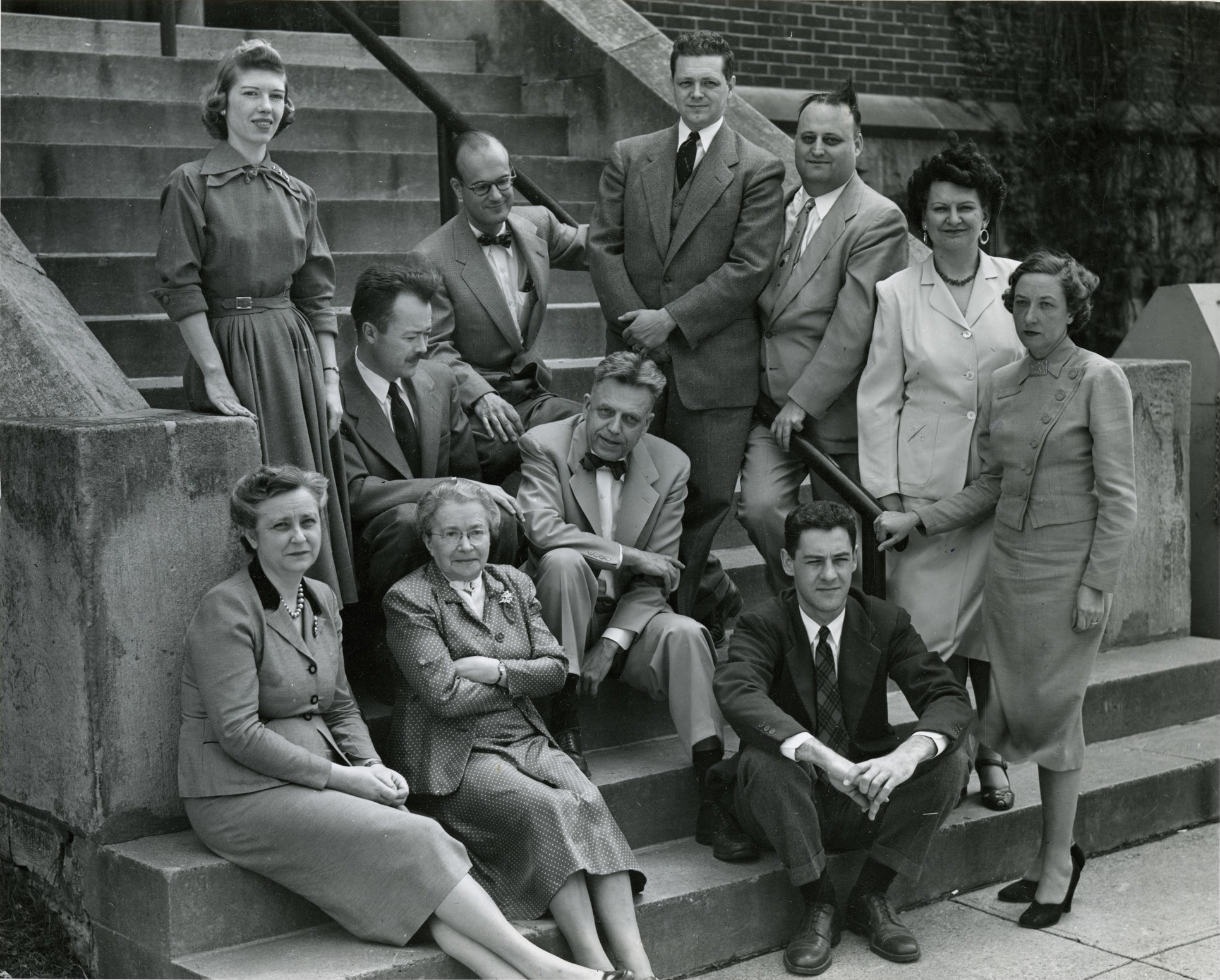
Kinsey (center) with staff of the Institute for Sexual Research, later renamed the Kinsey Institute

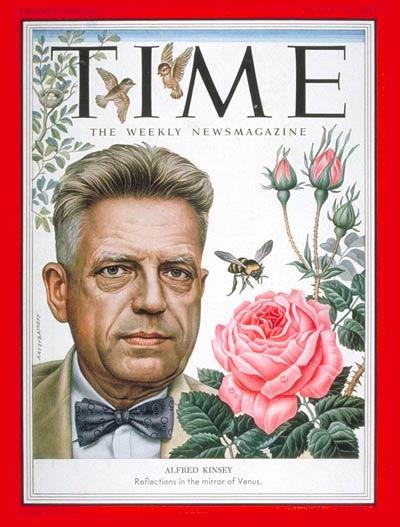
Alfred Kinsey on the cover of Time in 1953

Kinsey is widely regarded as the first major figure in American sexology; his research helped pave the way for a deeper exploration into sexuality among sexologists and the general public, as well as liberating female sexuality. For example, Kinsey's work disputed the notions that women generally are not sexual and that female orgasms experienced vaginally are superior to clitoral orgasms. He initially became interested in different forms of sexual practices in 1933, after discussing the topic extensively with a colleague, Robert Kroc. Kinsey had been studying the variations in mating practices among gall wasps. During this time, he developed a scale measuring sexual orientation, now known as the Kinsey scale, which ranges from 0 to 6, where 0 is exclusively heterosexual and 6 is exclusively homosexual; a rating of X for "no socio-sexual contacts or reactions" was later added.

In 1935, Kinsey delivered a lecture to a faculty discussion group at Indiana University, his first public discussion of the topic, wherein he attacked the "widespread ignorance of sexual structure and physiology" and promoted his view that "delayed marriage" (that is, delayed sexual experience) was psychologically harmful. Kinsey obtained research funding from the Rockefeller Foundation, which enabled him to further study human sexual behavior. He published Sexual Behavior in the Human Male in 1948, followed in 1953 by Sexual Behavior in the Human Female, both of which reached the top of the bestseller lists and turned Kinsey into a celebrity. These publications later became known as the Kinsey Reports. Articles about him appeared in magazines such as Time, Life, Look, and McCall's. The Kinsey Reports, which led to a storm of controversy, are regarded by many as a precursor to the sexual revolution of the 1960s and 1970s.

=== Controversies ===
Kinsey's research went beyond theory and interview to include observation of and participation in sexual activity, sometimes involving co-workers. Kinsey justified this sexual experimentation as being necessary to gain the confidence of his research subjects. He encouraged his staff to do likewise, and to engage in a wide range of sexual activity, to the extent that they felt comfortable; he argued that this would help his interviewers understand the participants' responses. Kinsey filmed sexual acts which included co-workers in the attic of his home as part of his research; Biographer Jonathan Gathorne-Hardy explains that this was done to ensure the films' secrecy, which would have caused a scandal had it become public knowledge. James H. Jones, author of Alfred C. Kinsey: A Public/Private Life, and British conservative cultural critic and psychiatrist Anthony Malcolm Daniels aka Theodore Dalrymple, among others, have speculated that Kinsey was driven by his own sexual needs.

Some of the data published in the two Kinsey Reports books is controversial in the scientific and psychiatric communities, owing to Kinsey's decision to interview volunteers who may not have been representative of the general population. University of Chicago sociology professor Edward Laumann also argued that Kinsey's work was focused on the biology of sex and lacked psychological and clinical information and analysis.

Kinsey collected sexual material from around the world, which brought him to the attention of the U.S. Customs Service when they seized some pornographic films in 1956; he died before this matter was resolved legally. Kinsey wrote about pre-adolescent orgasms using data in tables 30 to 34 of the male volume, which report observations of orgasms in over 300 children aged from two months up to fifteen years. This information was said to have come from adults' childhood memories, or from parent or teacher observation. Kinsey said he also interviewed nine men who had sexual experiences with children and who told him about the children's responses and reactions. Little attention was paid to this part of Kinsey's research at the time, but where Kinsey had gained this information began to be questioned nearly 40 years later. It was later revealed that Kinsey used data from a single pedophile and presented it as being from various sources. Kinsey knew the abuse would continue but had seen the need for participant confidentiality and anonymity as necessary to gain "honest answers on such taboo subjects". Years later, the Kinsey Institute said that the data on children in tables 31–34 came from one man's journal (started in 1917) and that the events concerned predated the Kinsey Reports. According to Mikella Procopio, "the lure of otherwise unattainable data was difficult to resist". But "Kinsey was fiercely against any use of force or compulsion in sex".

These allegations were revived by a dispute inside the Indiana State Senate. The opposition protested that these were "warmed over Internet memes that keep coming back." IndyStar asserted that opponents of Kinsey "cited long-held but largely debunked allegations".

Jones wrote that Kinsey's sexual activity influenced his work, that he over-represented prisoners and prostitutes, classified some single people as "married", and that he included a disproportionate number of homosexual men, which may have distorted his studies. While he has been criticized for omitting African Americans from his research, his report on the human male includes numerous references to African-American participants. Historian Vern Bullough writes that the data was later reinterpreted, excluding prisoners and data derived from an exclusively gay sample, and the results indicate that it does not appear to have skewed the data. Kinsey may have over-represented homosexuals, but Bullough considers that this may have been because homosexual behavior was stigmatized and needed to be better understood. Paul Gebhard, who was Kinsey's colleague from 1946 to 1956 and who also succeeded Kinsey as Director of the Kinsey Institute following his death, attempted to justify Kinsey's work in the 1970s by removing some of the suspect data where Kinsey allegedly showed a bias towards homosexuality. After Gebhard recalculated the findings in Kinsey's work, he found only slight differences between the original and updated figures.

Bailey et al., in their 2016 review of the sexual orientation literature, stated that Kinsey's survey likely overestimated the frequencies of nonheterosexual attractions and expressions, because his statistics show a higher percentage of the American population as homosexual or bisexual than more modern studies do. However Kinsey biographer Jonathan Gathorne-Hardy states that Kinsey's interview style was quite different from the methodologies of modern studies, something he attributes as a reason for difference of answers. Kinsey focused on in-depth interviews with subjects carried out by himself or highly trained members of his team, and emphasized creating rapport with the interviewee and making them feel comfortable and secure. Modern interviewers tend to be less thoroughly trained and emphasize scientific detachment, which may make respondents less likely to share sensitive personal details.

A postmodern take on Kinsey is that sexuality should not be made an object of science, i.e., postmodernism heavily rejects a study of sexuality based upon naturalistic assumptions.

== Personal life ==
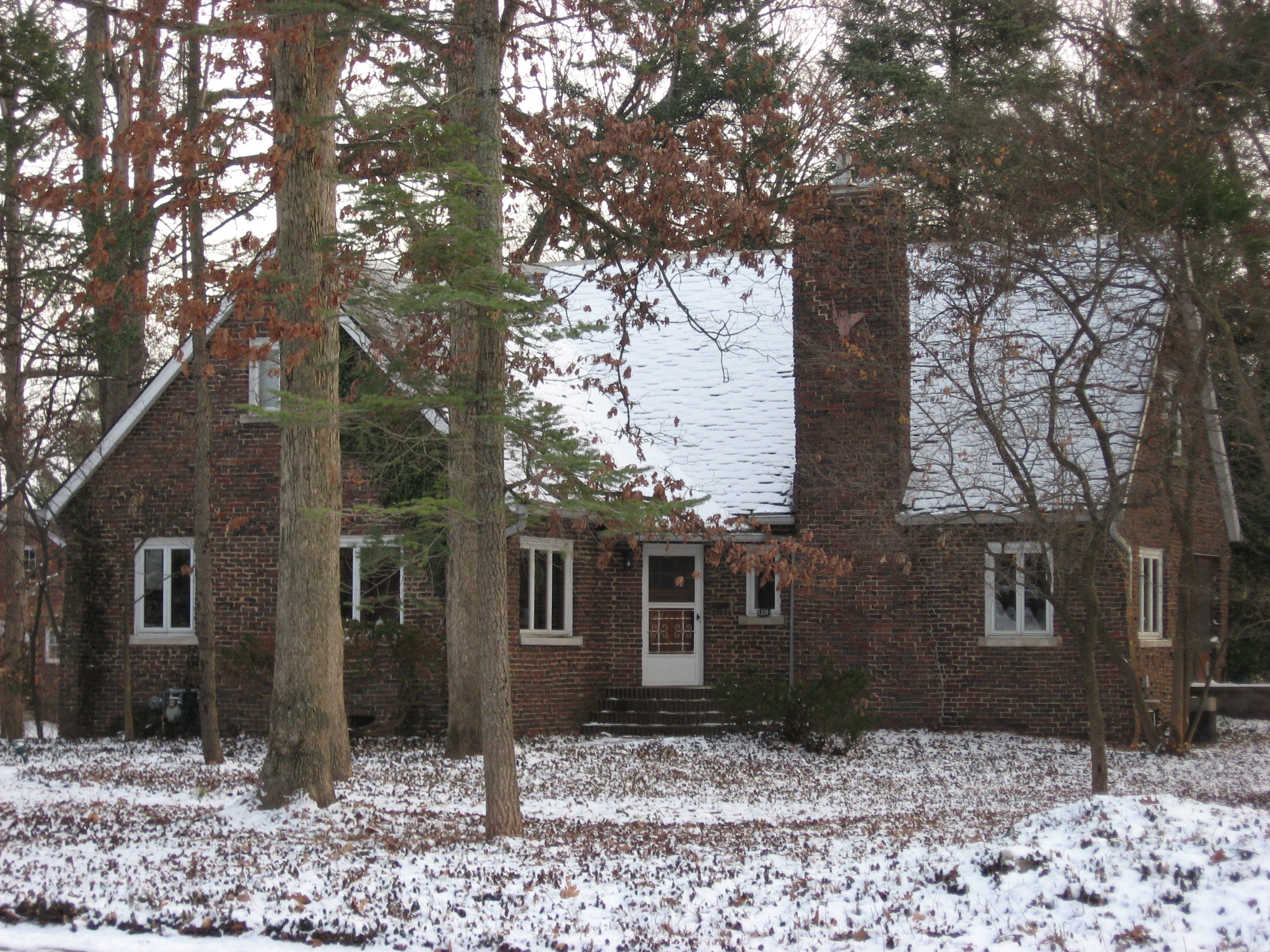
Kinsey's home in Bloomington, Indiana

Kinsey was raised as a Methodist, and for a time converted to a much less fundamentalist Congregationalism. During his studies at Harvard he apparently became agnostic or atheist, replacing religious fervor with fervor for science. He married Clara McMillen in 1921. Their marriage ceremony, like his college graduation, was avoided by Alfred Sr. The couple had four children. Their first son, Donald, born in 1922, died from complications of juvenile diabetes in 1927, just before his fifth birthday. Their first daughter, Anne, was born in 1924, followed by Joan in 1925, and then by their second son Bruce in 1928.

Kinsey was bisexual, and one biographer believes that as a young man he would punish himself for having homoerotic feelings. He and his wife agreed that both could have sex with other people as well as with each other. Kinsey had sex with other men, including his student Clyde Martin.

Kinsey was a friend of the occult filmmaker Kenneth Anger. In 1955, both visited the Abbey of Thelema in Cefalù, Sicily, where Aleister Crowley had established a commune.

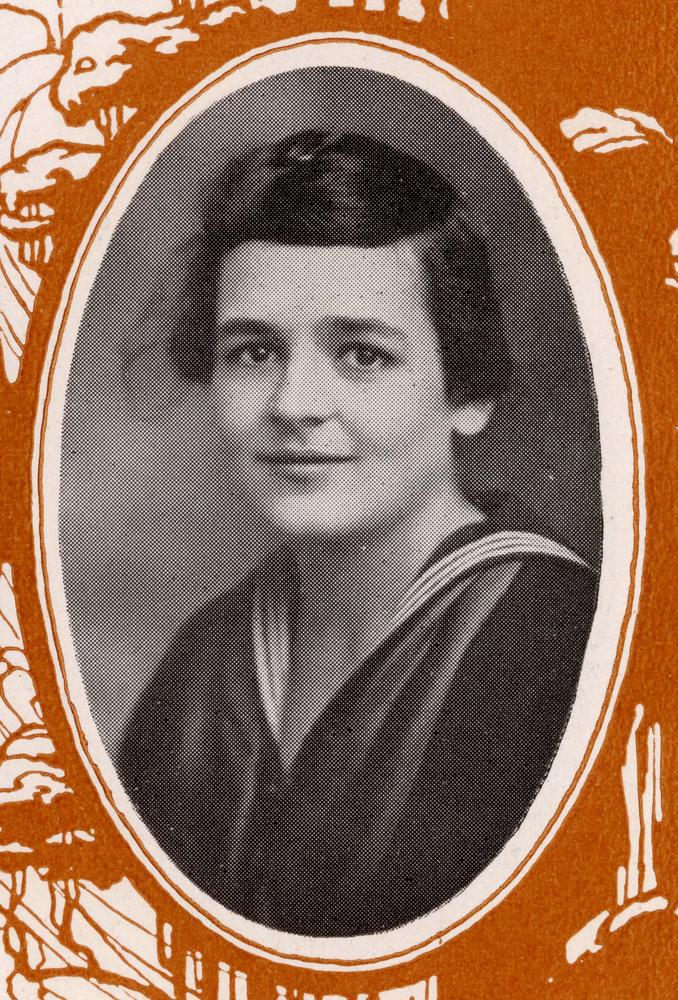
Clara McMillen in the Indiana University yearbook, 1921

Kinsey and Anger were interested in the Thelema religion that Crowley had created. According to Anger, "Kinsey was an agnostic. He wasn't a believer in anything, really, except science."

Kinsey designed his own house, which was built in the Vinegar Hill neighborhood of Bloomington, Indiana, at 1320 First Street. There he practiced his deep interest in gardening.

Kinsey died on August 25, 1956, in Bloomington Hospital at the age of 62. The cause of his death was reported to be a heart ailment and pneumonia. The New York Times ran the following editorial on August 27, 1956:

The untimely death of Dr. Alfred C. Kinsey takes from the American scene an important and valuable, as well as controversial, figure. Whatever may have been the reaction to his findings—and to the unscrupulous use of some of them—the fact remains that he was first, last, and always a scientist. In the long run, it is probable that the values of his contribution to contemporary thought will lie much less in what he found out than in the method he used and his way of applying it. Any sort of scientific approach to the problems of sex is difficult because the field is so deeply overlaid with such things as moral precept, taboo, individual and group training, and long-established behavior patterns. Some of these may be good in themselves, but they are no help to the scientific and empirical method of getting at the truth. Dr. Kinsey cut through this overlay with detachment and precision. His work was conscientious and comprehensive. Naturally, it will receive a serious setback with his death. Let us earnestly hope that the scientific spirit that inspired it will not be similarly impaired.

Kinsey was buried at Rose Hill Cemetery in Bloomington, Indiana.

== Legacy ==
The popularity of Sexual Behavior in the Human Male prompted widespread media interest in 1948. Time magazine declared, "Not since Gone With the Wind had booksellers seen anything like it." The first pop culture references to Kinsey appeared not long after the book's publication; "Martha Raye [sold] a half-million copies of 'Ooh, Dr. Kinsey!'" Cole Porter's song "Too Darn Hot", from the Tony Award-winning Broadway musical Kiss Me, Kate, devoted its bridge to "the Kinsey report / Every average man you know / Much prefers to play his favorite sport". In 1949 Mae West, reminiscing on the days when the word "sex" was rarely uttered, said of Kinsey, "That guy merely makes it easy for me. Now I don't have to draw 'em any blueprints ... We are both in the same business [...] Except I saw it first."

The publication of Sexual Behavior in the Human Female prompted even more intensive news coverage. Kinsey appeared on the cover of the August 24, 1953, issue of Time. The national news magazine featured two articles on the scientist, one focusing on his research, career and new book, the other on his background, personality, and lifestyle. In the magazine's cover portrait, "Flowers, birds, and a bee surround Kinsey; the mirror-of-Venus female symbol decorates his bow tie." The lead article concluded: "'Kinsey [...] has done for sex what Columbus did for geography,' declared a pair of enthusiasts [...] forgetting that Columbus did not know where he was when he got there. [...] Kinsey's work contains much that is valuable, but it must not be mistaken for the last word." A character called "Dr. Kinsey" appeared on the September 15, 1953, television episode of The Jack Benny Program as a bow-tied man interviewing a young woman on board a cruise ship that has left Hawaii. When "Dr. Kinsey" identifies himself to Jack Benny, Benny steps away in embarrassment. The "Dr. Kinsey" character was also written into another sketch in the same episode, commenting on a fantasy Benny is having about Marilyn Monroe (a guest on the episode).

The early 2000s saw a renewed interest in Kinsey. In 2003 Theatre of NOTE produced the Steve Morgan Haskell play titled Fucking Wasps which followed Kinsey's life from childhood until death. Written and directed by Steve Morgan Haskell, Fucking Wasps received many accolades, including a Playwriting of the Year nomination from Backstage West. Premiering in 2003, the musical Dr. Sex focuses on the relationship between Kinsey, his wife, and their shared lover Wally Matthews (based on Clyde Martin). The play had a score by Larry Bortniker, a book by Bortniker and Sally Deering, and won seven Jeff Awards. It was produced off-Broadway in 2005. The 2004 biographical film Kinsey, written and directed by Bill Condon, stars Liam Neeson as the scientist and Laura Linney as his wife. In 2004 T. Coraghessan Boyle's novel about Kinsey, The Inner Circle, was published. The following year, PBS produced the documentary Kinsey in cooperation with the Kinsey Institute, which allowed access to many of its files. Mr. Sex, a BBC radio play by Steve Coombes concerning Kinsey and his work, won the 2005 Imison Award.

In 2012, Kinsey was inducted into the Legacy Walk in Chicago, an outdoor public display which celebrates LGBT history and people.

In June 2019, Kinsey was one of the inaugural fifty American "pioneers, trailblazers, and heroes" inducted on the National LGBTQ Wall of Honor within the Stonewall National Monument (SNM) in New York City's Stonewall Inn. The SNM is the first U.S. national monument dedicated to LGBTQ rights and history, and the wall's unveiling was timed to take place during the 50th anniversary of the Stonewall riots.

== Significant publications ==
- "New Species and Synonymy of American Cynipidae". Bulletin of the American Museum of Natural History. 42: 293–317. 1920. hdl:2246/1148. Archived from the original on March 21, 2012.
- "Life Histories of American Cynipidae". Bulletin of the American Museum of Natural History. 42: 319–357. 1920. hdl:2246/1149. Archived from the original on March 21, 2012.
- "Phylogeny of Cynipid Genera and Biological Characteristics". Bulletin of the American Museum of Natural History. 42: 357a–c, 358–402. 1920. hdl:2246/1150. Archived from the original on March 21, 2012.
- Alfred C Kinsey (1926). An Introduction to Biology. Philadelphia: J.B. Lippincott Company. OCLC 2901872.
- Austin, Andrew; Dowton, Mark (2000) [1929]. "The Gall Wasp Genus Cynips: A Study in the Origin of Species". Indiana University Studies. 84–86: 1–517. ISBN 0-643-06610-1.
- New Introduction to Biology. Philadelphia: J.B. Lippincott Co. 1938 [1933].
- Kinsey, Alfred C (1936). The Origin of Higher Categories in Cynips. Indiana University.
- Merritt Lyndon Fernald; Alfred Charles Kinsey (1996) [First published 1943 by Idlewild Press, Cornwall-on-Hudson, N.Y.]. Edible Wild Plants of Eastern North America. Mineola, New York: Dover Publications (reprint of Harper 1958 edition). ISBN 0-486-29104-9.
- The Kinsey Reports:
  - Sexual Behavior in the Human Male (1948, reprinted 1998)
  - Sexual Behavior in the Human Female (1953, reprinted 1998)

== Bibliography ==
- Christenson, Cornelia (1971). Kinsey: A Biography. Bloomington: Indiana University Press.
- Drucker, Donna J. (2014). The Classification of Sex: Alfred Kinsey and the Organization of Knowledge. Pittsburgh: University of Pittsburgh Press. ISBN 0-8229-6303-5
- Gathorne-Hardy, Jonathan (1998). Alfred C. Kinsey: Sex the Measure of All Things. London: Chatto & Windus. ISBN 0-253-33734-8
- Hegarty, Peter (2013). Gentlemen's Disagreement: Alfred Kinsey, Lewis Terman, and the Sexual Politics of Smart Men. Chicago: The University of Chicago Press, 2013. ISBN 978-0-226-02444-8
- Jones, James H. (1997). Alfred C. Kinsey: A Public/Private Life. New York: Norton. ISBN 0-7567-7550-7
- Pomeroy, Wardell (1972). Dr. Kinsey and the Institute for Sex Research. New York: Harper & Row.
