= Kinsey (film) =

- Theatrical release poster
- Directed by: Bill Condon
- Written by: Bill Condon
- Produced by: Gail Mutrux
- Starring: Liam Neeson; Laura Linney; Chris O'Donnell; Peter Sarsgaard; Timothy Hutton; John Lithgow; Tim Curry; Oliver Platt; Dylan Baker
- Cinematography: Frederick Elmes
- Edited by: Virginia Katz
- Music by: Carter Burwell
- Production companies: American Zoetrope; Myriad Pictures
- Distributed by: Fox Searchlight Pictures
- Release dates: September 4, 2004 (Telluride); November 12, 2004 (United States)
- Running time: 118 minutes
- Country: United States
- Language: English
- Budget: $11 million
- Box office: $16.9 million

Kinsey is a 2004 American biographical drama film written and directed by Bill Condon. It describes the life of Alfred Charles Kinsey (played by Liam Neeson), a pioneer in the area of sexology. His 1948 publication, Sexual Behavior in the Human Male (the first of the Kinsey Reports) was one of the first recorded works that tried to scientifically address and investigate sexual behavior in humans. The film also stars Laura Linney (in a performance nominated for the Academy Award for Best Supporting Actress), Chris O'Donnell, Peter Sarsgaard, Timothy Hutton, John Lithgow, Tim Curry, Oliver Platt, and Dylan Baker.

Kinsey premiered at Telluride on September 4, 2004, before being released by Fox Searchlight Pictures in the United States on November 12, 2004. The film received positive reviews from critics and grossed $16.9 million against an $11 million budget.

== Plot ==
Professor Alfred Kinsey is interviewed about his sexual history. Interspersed with the interview are flashbacks from his childhood and young-adulthood. The early years show his father, a lay minister of the Methodist church, denouncing modern inventions as leading to sexual sin, then in early adolescence, humiliating Kinsey in a store by denouncing its keeper for showing him cigarettes, while his adolescence shows his experiences as a Boy Scout and a late teenage scene shows Kinsey disappointing his father by his chosen vocational intentions. The adult Kinsey teaches at Indiana University as a professor of biology lecturing on gall wasps.

Kinsey falls in love with a student in his class, whom he calls Mac, and marries her. Consummation of their marriage is difficult at first, because of a medical problem Mac has that is fixed easily with minor surgery. At the university, Professor Kinsey, who is affectionately called "Prok" by his graduate students, meets with them after hours to offer individual sexual advice.

At a book party celebrating Kinsey's latest publication on gall wasps, Kinsey approaches the dean of students about an open-forum sex education course as opposed to the anti-sex propaganda taught in a general health education class. It is approved, but on the grounds that it is open only to teachers, graduate or senior students, and married students. Kinsey begins teaching the sex course to a packed auditorium.

Kinsey continues answering students' questions in personal meetings but his answers are severely limited by the paucity of scientific data about human sexual behavior. This leads Kinsey to pass out questionnaires in his sexual education class from which he learns of the enormous disparity between what society had assumed people do and what their actual practices are. After securing financial support from the Rockefeller Foundation, Kinsey and his research assistants, including his closest assistant, Clyde Martin, travel the country, interviewing subjects about their sexual histories.

As time progresses Kinsey realizes that sexuality within humans, including himself, is a lot more varied than was originally thought. The range of expression he creates becomes known as the Kinsey scale, which ranks overall sexuality from completely heterosexual to completely homosexual.

The first sexological book Kinsey publishes, which is on the sexual habits of the male, is a large-scale success and a best seller. Kinsey turns his research to women and is met with more controversy. With the release of the volume on female sexual behavior, support for his work declines in a time when Senator Joseph McCarthy's witch hunts against Communists and homosexuals (the latter known as the Lavender Scare) lead the Rockefeller Foundation to withdraw its financial support, fearing that it be labeled "Communist" for backing the subversion of traditional American values.

Kinsey feels he has failed everyone who has ever been a victim of sexual ignorance. A customs officer is tipped off to an importation of some of Kinsey's research material, which only exacerbates the financial hardship of Kinsey's research organization. Kinsey suffers a heart attack, and is found to have developed an addiction to barbiturates. Meeting with other philanthropists fails to garner the support needed. Still, Kinsey continues his taking of sex histories.

Returning to the initial interview, Kinsey is asked about love and whether he will ever conduct research on it. He responds that love is impossible to measure and impossible to quantify, but that it is important. Kinsey and Mac pull over to the side of the road for a nature walk. She remarks about a tree that has been there for a thousand years. Kinsey replies that the tree seems to display a strong love in the way its roots grip the earth. The two walk off together, Kinsey remarking "there's a lot of work to do".

== Cast ==
- Liam Neeson as Alfred Kinsey
  - Benjamin Walker as 19-year-old Alfred
  - Matthew Fahey as 14-year-old Alfred
  - Will Denton as 10-year-old Alfred
- Laura Linney as Clara McMillen
- Peter Sarsgaard as Clyde Martin
- Chris O'Donnell as Wardell Pomeroy
- Timothy Hutton as Paul Gebhard
- John Lithgow as Alfred Seguine Kinsey
- Tim Curry as Thurman Rice
- Oliver Platt as Herman Wells
- Dylan Baker as Alan Gregg
- William Sadler as Kenneth Braun
- John McMartin as Huntington Hartford
- John Krasinski as Ben
- Lynn Redgrave as Final interview subject
- Julianne Nicholson as Alice Martin
- Veronica Cartwright as Sara Kinsey
- Kathleen Chalfant as Barbara Merkle
- Heather Goldenhersh as Martha Pomeroy
- David Harbour as Robert Kinsey
- Judith J.K. Polson as Mildred Kinsey
- Leigh Spofford as Anne Kinsey
- Jenna Gavigan as Joan Kinsey
- Luke MacFarlane as Bruce Kinsey
- Bill Buell as Dr. Thomas Lattimore

== Production ==
Producer Gail Mutrux handed Bill Condon a biography of Kinsey in 1999 to spark his interest in writing a screenplay. Condon then based his original screenplay on elements in the biography combined with his own original research on Kinsey.

Ian McKellen was at one point in negotiations for a supporting role.

== Release ==
Kinsey was the first film permitted to show human genitalia uncensored in Japan, known for its strict censorship policies regarding genitalia.

== Reception ==
The review aggregator website Rotten Tomatoes reported that 90% of critics have given the film a positive review based on 196 reviews, with an average rating of 7.66/10. The site's critics consensus reads, "A biopic of the sex researcher is hailed as adventurous, clever, and subversive, with fine performances by Liam Neeson and Laura Linney." On Metacritic, the film has a weighted average score of 79 out of 100 based on 40 critics, indicating "generally favorable" reviews. Reviewing in the Chicago Sun-Times, Roger Ebert gave Kinsey four out of four stars and hailed it as a "fascinating bio" whose strength lies in "the clarity it brings to its title character ... a complete original, a person of intelligence and extremes", as well as how it "captures its times, and a political and moral climate of fear and repression". Ebert compared Neeson's performance to that of Russell Crowe in the 2001 biopic A Beautiful Mind.

The film grossed $10,254,979 domestically and $16,918,723 worldwide on an $11 million budget.

=== Top ten lists ===
Kinsey was listed on many critics' top ten lists for 2004.

- 5th – Stephen Holden, The New York Times
- 5th – Owen Gleiberman, Entertainment Weekly
- 6th – Peter Travers, Rolling Stone
- 7th – A.O. Scott, The New York Times
- 7th – Jack Matthews, New York Daily News
- 7th – Kevin Thomas, Los Angeles Times
- 7th – Ruthie Stein, San Francisco Chronicle
- 8th – Ty Burr, The Boston Globe
- 8th – Richard Schickel, Time
- 9th – Scott Foundas, L.A. Weekly
- 10th – David Ansen, Newsweek
- Top 10 (listed alphabetically) – Joe Morgenstern, The Wall Street Journal
- Top 10 (listed alphabetically) – Carina Chocano, Los Angeles Times
- Top 10 (listed alphabetically) – Ella Taylor, L.A. Weekly

=== Awards and nominations ===
Year	Award	Category	Nominee	Result	Ref.
2004	Academy Awards	Best Supporting Actress	Laura Linney	Nominated	
2004	Golden Globe Awards	Best Motion Picture - Drama	Kinsey	Nominated	
2004	Golden Globe Awards	Best Actor - Drama Film	Liam Neeson	Nominated	
2004	Golden Globe Awards	Best Actress - Drama Film	Laura Linney	Nominated	
2004	Screen Actors Guild Awards	Outstanding Supporting Actress	Laura Linney	Nominated	
2004	Broadcast Film Critics Association	Best Picture	Kinsey	Nominated	
2004	Broadcast Film Critics Association	Best Supporting Actor	Peter Sarsgaard	Nominated	
2004	Broadcast Film Critics Association	Best Supporting Actress	Laura Linney	Nominated	
2004	Broadcast Film Critics Association	Best Screenplay	Bill Condon	Nominated	
2004	Independent Spirit Awards	Best Film	Kinsey	Nominated	
2004	Independent Spirit Awards	Best Male Lead	Liam Neeson	Nominated	
2004	Independent Spirit Awards	Best Female Lead	Laura Linney	Nominated	
2004	Independent Spirit Awards	Best Screenplay	Bill Condon	Nominated	
2004	Los Angeles Film Critics Association	Best Actor	Liam Neeson	Won	
2004	American Film Institute Awards	Top 10 American Films of 2004	Kinsey	Won	
2004	National Board of Review	Top Ten Films	Kinsey	Won	
2004	National Board of Review	Best Supporting Actress	Laura Linney	Won	
2004	National Society of Film Critics	Best Supporting Actor	Peter Sarsgaard	Nominated	
2004	National Society of Film Critics	Best Supporting Actress	Laura Linney	Nominated	
2005	Berlin International Film Festival	Golden Bear	Kinsey	Nominated	
2004	London Film Critics Circle	British Actor of the Year	Liam Neeson	Nominated	
2004	London Film Critics Circle	British Actress of the Year	Laura Linney	Nominated	
2004	Writers Guild of America	Best Original Screenplay	Bill Condon	Nominated	
