= Peter Sarsgaard =

American actor (born 1971)

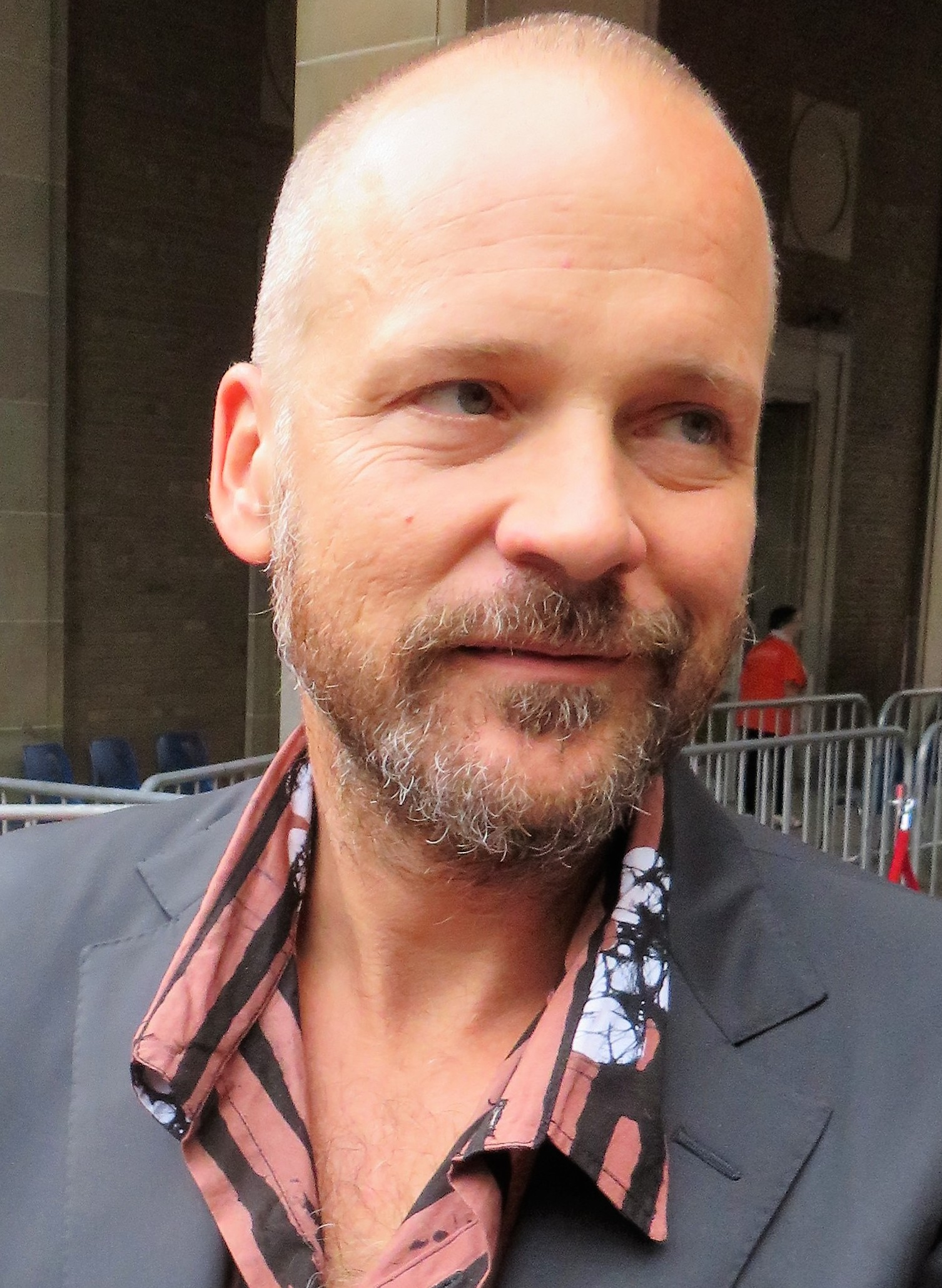
- Sarsgaard in 2019
- Born: John Peter Sarsgaard; March 7, 1971 (age 55); Scott Air Force Base, Illinois, U.S.
- Education: Washington University in St. Louis (BA)
- Occupation: Actor
- Years active: 1995–present
- Spouse: Maggie Gyllenhaal (m. 2009)
- Children: 2
- Relatives: Jake Gyllenhaal (brother-in-law)

John Peter Sarsgaard (/ˈsɑːrzɡɑːrd/; born March 7, 1971) is an American actor. He studied at the Actors Studio, before rising to prominence playing atypical and sometimes villainous roles in film and television.

He made his film debut with Dead Man Walking (1995). He gained recognition for his roles in The Man in the Iron Mask (1998), Boys Don't Cry (1999), and The Center of the World (2001). He received a nomination for the Golden Globe Award for Best Supporting Actor for his portrayal of Charles Lane in Shattered Glass (2003) and won the Volpi Cup for Best Actor for playing a man with dementia in Memory (2023).

Sarsgaard has acted in films such as Garden State, Kinsey (both 2004), Jarhead, Flightplan (both 2005), Elegy (2008), An Education, Orphan (both 2009), Lovelace, Blue Jasmine (both 2013), Black Mass (2015), Jackie (2016), and The Lost Daughter (2021). He is also known for acting in blockbuster films, such as Knight and Day (2010), Green Lantern (2011), The Magnificent Seven (2016), and The Batman (2022).

Sarsgaard is also known for his television roles including in the AMC/Netflix crime series The Killing (2013), the Hulu limited series The Looming Tower (2018) and Dopesick (2021), and the Apple TV+ series Presumed Innocent (2024), earning Primetime Emmy Award nominations for Dopesick and Presumed Innocent. Sarsgaard made his Broadway debut portraying Boris Alexeyevich Trigorin in the revival of Anton Chekhov's The Seagull (2008).

== Early life and education ==
John Peter Sarsgaard was born at Scott Air Force Base in St. Clair County, Illinois, on March 7, 1971, the son of Judy Lea (née Reinhardt) and John Dale Sarsgaard. His father was an Air Force engineer and later worked for Monsanto and IBM. His surname originates in Denmark, where his paternal great-great-grandparents were born; it is pronounced [ˈsɑːsɡɔˀ] in Danish.

Sarsgaard was raised a Catholic and served as an altar boy. His family moved more than 12 times during his childhood, following his father's job. At the age of 7, Sarsgaard originally wanted to become a soccer player and took up ballet to help improve his coordination. After suffering several concussions while playing soccer, he gave up the sport and became interested in writing and theater. He attended Fairfield College Preparatory School, a private Jesuit boys' school in Connecticut, where he became interested in film.

Following his graduation from Fairfield Prep in 1989, he attended Bard College in New York for two years before transferring to Washington University in St. Louis (WashU) in 1991, where he co-founded improvisational comedy troupe "Mama's Pot Roast". While at WashU, Sarsgaard began performing in plays in an offshoot of New York's Actors Studio; His first role was as the servant Laurent in Molière's Tartuffe. In 1993, he graduated with a bachelor's degree in history and moved to New York.

== Career ==
=== 1995–1998: Early work ===
Sarsgaard branched out with guest roles in television productions filmed in New York City, with Law & Order in 1995, and New York Undercover (1997) as well as an appearance in the 1997 HBO special Subway Stories. He appeared in his first film role in Dead Man Walking (1995), where he played a teenager killed by a convict (Sean Penn).

In 1995, Sarsgaard made his theatrical debut in the Off-Broadway production of Horton Foote's Laura Dennis, which was directed by James Houghton. Ben Brantley of The New York Times wrote: "Mr. Sarsgaard ... emerges as an actor to watch with a performance of breathtaking emotional conviction." The following year he starred in Kingdom of Earth opposite Cynthia Nixon and directed by John Cameron Mitchell. His performance in the play received favorable reviews among critics.

His next film roles were in a series of independent features: Another Day in Paradise (1997), part of an ensemble cast that included James Woods, Melanie Griffith, Vincent Kartheiser, and Natasha Gregson Wagner, and In Desert Blue (1998), where he had a supporting role in the film. He received a substantial role in the 1998 film The Man in the Iron Mask, where he played Raoul, the ill-fated son of John Malkovich's dueling Musketeer, Athos. The film uses characters from Alexandre Dumas' d'Artagnan Romances, and is very loosely adapted from some plot elements of The Vicomte de Bragelonne. The film received ambivalent reviews, but was a success at the box office, earning $182 million worldwide.

=== 1999–2002: Career progression ===
In 1999, Sarsgaard earned critical recognition in Kimberly Peirce's Boys Don't Cry, where he was cast as notorious killer John Lotter. The film is based on the real-life story of Brandon Teena, who was raped and murdered in 1993 by Lotter and Tom Nissen after they found out that he was a trans man. Boys Don't Cry received overwhelmingly positive acclaim from critics, and his performance was critically well received. According to The Boston Globe, "Peter Sarsgaard ... makes the killer's terrible trajectory not only believable, but grounded in the most mundane clodhopper behavior. He isn't a drooling monster, he's a guy you wouldn't look twice at a bar or a convenience store." A contributor from the Seattle Post-Intelligencer wrote "It's a marvelous performance supported ably by ... Sarsgaard as the unpredictable, sociopathic Lotter." The film was screened at a special presentation at the 2000 Venice Film Festival. In regards to his character, as how Sarsgaard made him "likeable, sympathetic even" was because he wanted the audience "to understand why they would hang out with me. If my character wasn't necessarily likable, I wanted him to be charismatic enough that you weren't going to have a dull time if you were with him." In another interview, Sarsgaard said he felt "empowered" by playing Lotter.

His first leading role was in the 2001 feature The Center of the World, where he plays Richard Longman, a lonely young entrepreneur who skips out on his company's big initial public offering and pays a stripper (Molly Parker) $10,000 to fly to Las Vegas with him. The film received average reviews, however, A.O. Scott of the New York Times, reported that the performances by both Sarsgaard and Parker "provide a rough grain of authenticity, capturing the blunted affect and aimless neediness of people in their 20s struggling to navigate a world of material abundance and impoverished emotional possibility." Scott concluded in his recap that Sarsgaard made his character "seem like a genuinely nice guy, too innocent to grasp the sleaziness of his bargain with Florence."

In 2002, Sarsgaard starred in three films, K-19: The Widowmaker, Empire and The Salton Sea. In K-19: The Widowmaker, he portrayed a young Russian navy lieutenant Vadim Radchenko, a prototype of Boris Korchilov. The film's budget cost was $100 million to make, but upon release, it grossed $35 million in the United States and $30 million internationally, qualifying it as a box office failure. His next role was in Empire, a crime thriller, where he was cast in a supporting role. Sarsgaard played a meth addict in D. J. Caruso's The Salton Sea. In October 2002, Sarsgaard returned to theater in a New York production of Lanford Wilson's Burn This, where he replaced Edward Norton.

=== 2003–present: Continued success ===
2003 marked a significant turning point in Sarsgaard's career when he starred in the feature film Shattered Glass. He depicted journalist Charles Lane, the lead editor of The New Republic. Shattered Glass is based on the real events of journalist Stephen Glass' career at The New Republic during the mid-1990s and his fall when his widespread journalistic fraud is exposed. During the film's promotion, Sarsgaard noted his portrayal of Lane: "I just wanted to get his perspective on the actual events. [...] I think that I tried to have some respect for myself and that way you're respecting the real person you're playing. I've done it a number of times. And it's always a little bit confusing. The best thing to do is just to ignore the fact, I think, that you're playing somebody who is a real-life character." According to the San Diego Union-Tribune, "Peter Sarsgaard is appealingly level, a stolid straight-shooter as Lane". A reviewer from the Chicago Tribune noted that Sarsgaard plays Lane with "great subtlety and grace". The newspaper concluded with, "The character doesn't seethe with personal resentment; when he does a slow burn, he conveys a much deeper sense of a man's value system being violated past the breaking point." Sarsgaard's performance in the film earned him his first Golden Globe Award nomination and an Independent Spirit Award nomination.

Following the success of Shattered Glass, Sarsgaard starred in several roles. In 2004, he starred in the comedy-drama Garden State, where he played Mark, the sarcastic best friend to Zach Braff's character. In the same year, Sarsgaard portrayed Clyde Martin, in the biographical film Kinsey, a movie about the life of Alfred Kinsey, played by Liam Neeson. Kinsey was Sarsgaard's first film role which featured full frontal nudity. Paul Clinton of CNN reported that Sarsgaard's Clyde Martin "stands out" and "confirms that he's without doubt one of the best character actors of his generation." When asked about his kissing scenes with Neeson in Kinsey, Sarsgaard said:

It wasn't as hard as, say, running around with all my gear on in Jarhead. I'd rather go for an awkward moment than physical exertion any day. The only thing that I think [male actors] get freaked out about when they have to do something like kiss a guy in a movie—when to their knowledge they're straight—is that they're afraid they're going to be turned on. And if you're not afraid that you're going to be turned on—meaning that you know what you like—then really it's not that hard.

In 2005, Sarsgaard starred in the drama The Dying Gaul, where he plays Robert Sandrich, a struggling screenwriter who has written a serious love story about a man and his terminally ill partner. The film received favorable reviews. In an interview, Sarsgaard said, he felt like he was playing a character based on Craig Lucas, the director, whom he describes as "elitist in a fun way". Because his character, a screenwriter, is also "elitist," when he sells his soul by compromising his artistic vision, "...the conflict seems bigger. Anyone can sell their soul. Even people with integrity. There's always that temptation to guard against. Which is why it's best to keep as much as possible hidden."

Also in 2005, he had supporting roles in the suspense thriller films The Skeleton Key and Robert Schwentke's Flightplan. In the latter film, Sarsgaard played an air marshall, who is ordered to keep guard of Jodie Foster's character. Flightplan was screened at a special presentation at the 30th annual Toronto International Film Festival in 2005. Despite the mixed reviews, the film was a financial success, earning $223 million worldwide, making it his highest-grossing film to the end of 2008. Sarsgaard's next feature was Jarhead (2005), opposite Jake Gyllenhaal. The movie is based on U.S. Marine Anthony Swofford's 2003 Gulf War memoir of the same name.

Sarsgaard hosted Saturday Night Live (SNL) on January 21, 2006. In his introductory monolog, he tried to point out that he was a nice guy despite his sometimes macabre roles. Video clips were then played of Sarsgaard scaring the SNL cast. One sketch featured the severe acute respiratory syndrome (SARS) global scare, which was still fresh in many minds, and one of the skits included a promotion for the Peter Sarsgaard "SARS-Guard", a reference to facemasks.

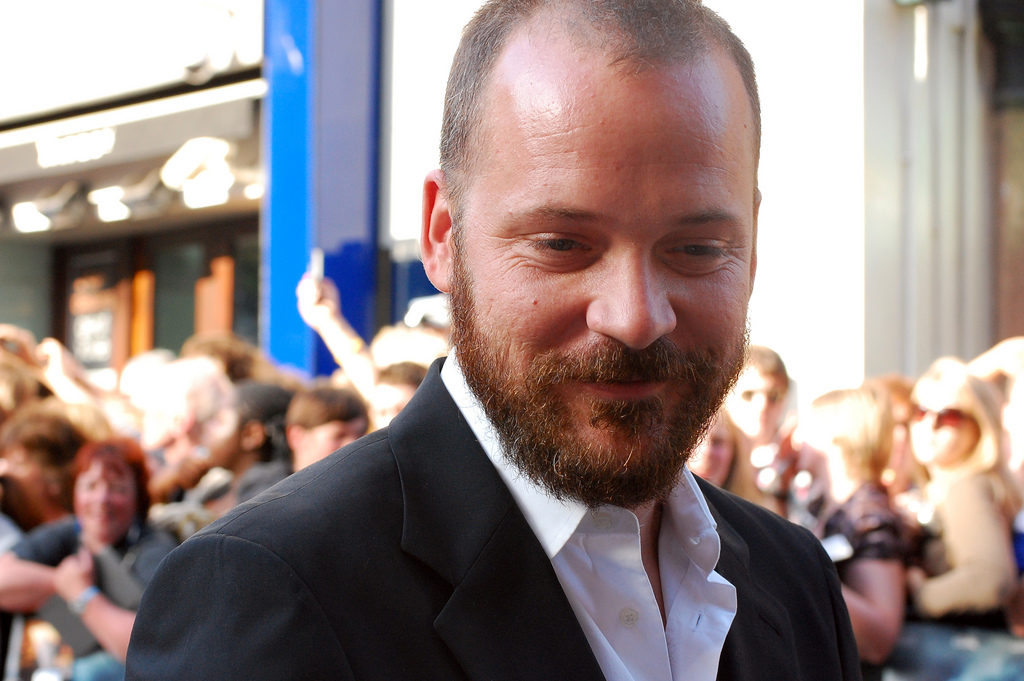
Sarsgaard attending the European premiere of The Dark Knight in 2008

In 2007, he starred in supporting roles in Year of the Dog and Rendition. Year of the Dog is a dark comedy about a lonely middle-aged woman, played by Molly Shannon, who finds that animals are the only beings she can truly rely on. Sarsgaard plays Newt, an androgynous dog trainer, and love interest for Shannon's character. He starred alongside Meryl Streep, Alan Arkin, Reese Witherspoon, and Jake Gyllenhaal in Rendition, a Gavin Hood-directed political thriller about the US policy of extraordinary rendition. Viewed as a sex symbol, Sarsgaard was named one of Salon.com's Sexiest Man Living in 2007. 2008 saw Sarsgaard star in the drama Elegy, based on a Phillip Roth novel, The Dying Animal. The film received favorable reception among critics.

In 2008, Sarsgaard made his Broadway debut at the Royal Court Theatre of Anton Chekhov's adaptation The Seagull alongside Kristin Scott Thomas, Mackenzie Crook and Carey Mulligan. In the production, he plays, Boris Alexeyevich Trigorin, a tortured writer who drives a rival to suicide and a young lover to ruin. For the role, Sarsgaard had been required to speak in a British accent, in which he wanted it to be "less liked by an American audience". Adam Feldman for Time Out praised the production but wrote of Sarsgaard's performance, "Some of the Americans struggle—notably Peter Sarsgaard, who plays Trigorin’s passivity so aggressively that his costars have nothing to work against."

In 2009, Sarsgaard starred alongside Jon Foster and Sienna Miller in the drama The Mysteries of Pittsburgh. It is an adaptation of Michael Chabon's novel of the same name. In the movie, Sarsgaard plays Cleveland, the rebellious bisexual boyfriend of Miller's character. The Mysteries of Pittsburgh premiered at the 2008 Sundance Film Festival. His next film appearance was in the thriller Orphan, where he and Vera Farmiga play a married couple who lose a baby and adopt a nine-year-old girl, who is not as innocent as she claims to be. Furthermore, in the same year, Sarsgaard starred as David in Lone Scherfig's coming of age film An Education. The role required Sarsgaard to speak in a British accent. An Education drew favorable reviews from critics. According to Variety, "Sarsgaard ... marvelously expresses the savoir faire that has such an impact on Jenny [Carey Mulligan]."

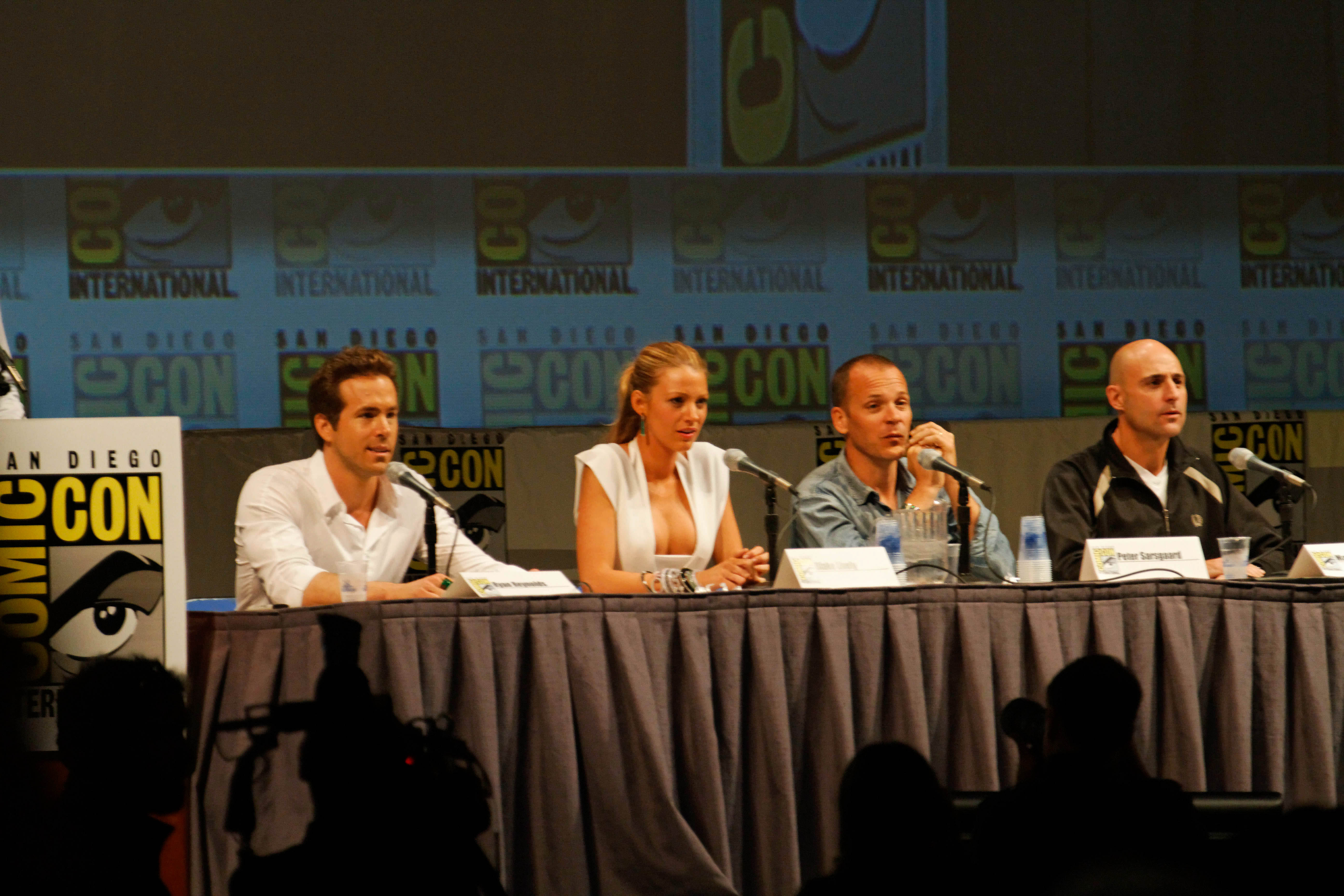
Sarsgaard with the cast of Green Lantern at the 2010 San Diego Comic-Con.

Sarsgaard played Mikhail Lvovich Astrov, a country doctor and philosopher, in the Classic Stage Company's 2009 off-Broadway production of Anton Chekhov's Uncle Vanya in New York City. The cast also included Maggie Gyllenhaal, Mamie Gummer, Denis O'Hare, and George Morfogen. The production, directed by Austin Pendleton, began previews on January 17 and ended its limited run on March 1. Joe Dziemianowicz of the New York Daily News gave the production one out of four stars, but complimented his performance, writing that Sarsgaard does a "credible job as the doctor". In the Bloomberg review of Uncle Vanya, John Simon, wrote: "Sarsgaard can't find the right tempi or emphases: shuttling between colorless rattle and silence-studded rallentandos, he fails at both infectious enthusiasm and self-effacing charm."

Sarsgaard played a federal agent in the action comedy film Knight and Day, released in June 2010, in which he appeared alongside Tom Cruise and Cameron Diaz. In May 2010, it was reported that Sarsgaard would star in Chekhov's play Three Sisters. The production began in January 2011, and Sarsgaard was reunited with Uncle Vanya director Austin Pendleton. In February 2010, it was announced that Sarsgaard had been cast as villain Hector Hammond in the superhero film Green Lantern. The film was released in 2011. He played a supporting role in Woody Allen's drama Blue Jasmine (2013). Sarsgaard also appeared in the American TV series The Killing (2013) as a man on death row perhaps wrongfully convicted for the brutal murder of his wife, a performance which he said included "some of the best acting I have ever done in my life." Sarsgaard appeared in a 2015 Classic Stage Company production of Hamlet in the title role. He portrayed Robert F. Kennedy in Pablo Larraín's Jackie (2016).

Sarsgaard then took a role as Martin Schmidt in the Hulu limited series The Looming Tower (2018), earning a nomination for the Critics' Choice Television Award for Best Supporting Actor in a Movie/Miniseries. He returned to television in another Hulu miniseries Dopesick (2021) playing Rick Mountcastle, for which he received a Primetime Emmy Award for Outstanding Supporting Actor in a Limited or Anthology Series or Movie nomination. Sarsgaard appeared in The Lost Daughter (2021), directed by his wife Maggie Gyllenhaal, and the following year played the role of District Attorney Gil Colson in The Batman (2022). In 2023, he starred opposite Jessica Chastain in the Michel Franco film Memory which premiered at the 80th Venice International Film Festival. Sarsgaard portrayed a man riddled with dementia. He stated, "A lot of time when we see dementia in movies, it's the most extreme stage at the very end and it paralyses us all with fear, and I really didn't want to depict that." For his performance he won the Volpi Cup for Best Actor. For his work in the Apple TV+ series Presumed Innocent (2024), he received a second Primetime Emmy Award nomination.

In June 2026, Sarsgaard was cast as Amon in the third season of the HBO post-apocalyptic drama series The Last of Us.

== Personal life ==
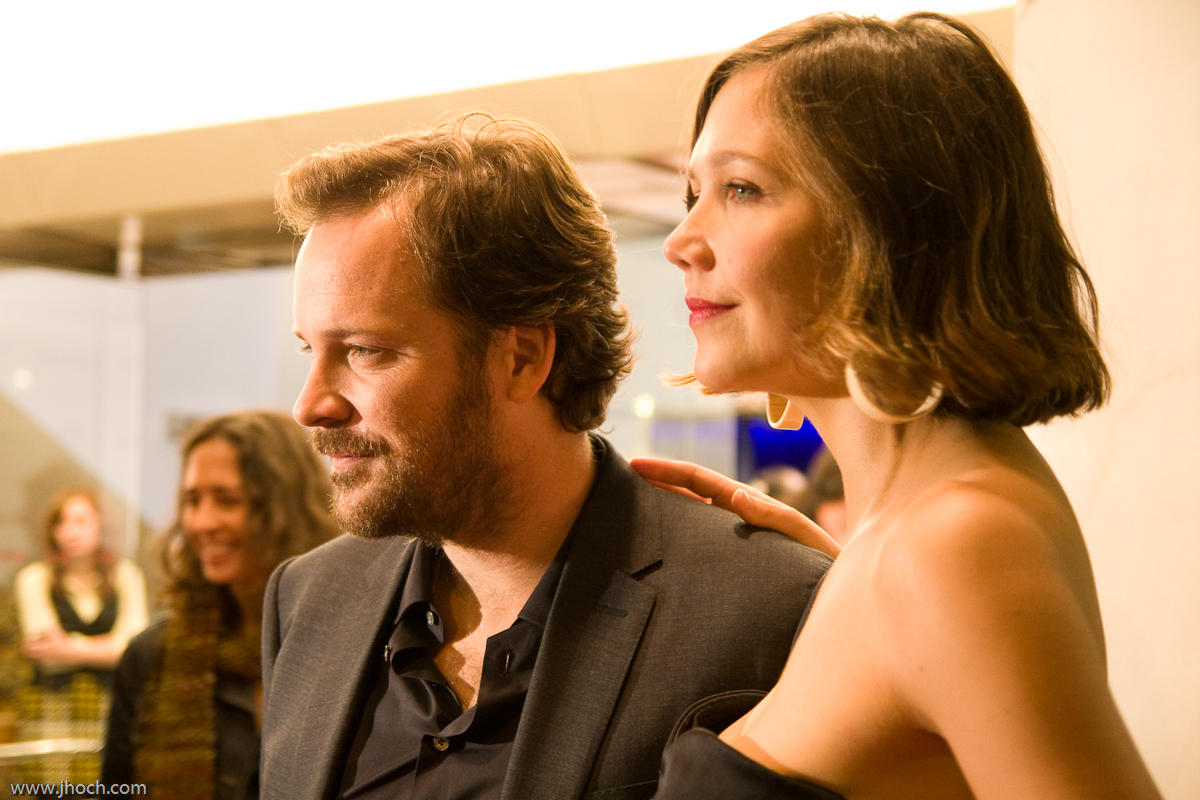
Sarsgaard and Maggie Gyllenhaal at the New York premiere of An Education in October 2009

In an interview with The New York Times, Sarsgaard stated that he followed Catholicism, saying: "I like the death-cult aspect of Catholicism. Every religion is interested in death, but Catholicism takes it to a particularly high level. [...] Seriously, in Catholicism, you're supposed to love your enemy. That really impressed me as a kid, and it has helped me as an actor. [...] The way that I view the characters I play is part of my religious upbringing. To abandon curiosity in all personalities, good or bad, is to give up hope in humanity."

Among his most notable romantic relationships, Sarsgaard dated burlesque dancer Dita Von Teese and model and actress Shalom Harlow. Early in his film career, he dated photographer Malerie Marder, a close friend from his days attending Bard College, who had featured Sarsgaard in some of her early work.

Sarsgaard began a romantic relationship with actress Maggie Gyllenhaal, the sister of his close friend Jake Gyllenhaal, in 2002. In April 2006, they announced their engagement, and on May 2, 2009, they married in a small ceremony in Brindisi, Italy. They have two daughters, born in October 2006 and April 2012.

Sarsgaard is vegan, but says he cooks meat for his children.

In June 2013, Sarsgaard and numerous other celebrities appeared in a video showing support for Chelsea Manning. He is a signatory of the Film Workers for Palestine boycott pledge that was published in September 2025.

== Filmography ==
=== Film ===
Year	Title	Role	Notes	Refs.
1995	Dead Man Walking	Walter Delacroix		
1998	The Man in the Iron Mask	Raoul		
1998	Minor Details	Scott		
1998	Desert Blue	Billy Baxter		
1998	Another Day in Paradise	Ty		
1999	Boys Don't Cry	John Lotter		
2000	The Cell	John Tracy	Uncredited	
2000	Housebound	Tom		
2001	The Center of the World	Richard Longman		
2001	Bacon Wagon	Cowboy Zombie Victim	Short film	
2002	Empire	Jack		
2002	The Salton Sea	Jimmy the Finn		
2002	K-19: The Widowmaker	LT Vadim Radchenko		
2002	Unconditional Love	Window Washer		
2003	Death of a Dynasty	Brendon III		
2003	Shattered Glass	Charles "Chuck" Lane		
2004	Garden State	Mark		
2004	Kinsey	Clyde Martin		
2005	The Dying Gaul	Robert Sandrich		
2005	The Skeleton Key	Luke Marshall		
2005	Flightplan	Gene Carson		
2005	Jarhead	Cpl. Alan Troy		
2007	Year of the Dog	Newt		
2007	Rendition	Alan Smith		
2008	Elegy	Kenneth Kepesh		
2008	The Mysteries of Pittsburgh	Cleveland Arning		
2009	An Education	David Goldman		
2009	In the Electric Mist	Elrod Sykes		
2009	Orphan	John Coleman		
2010	Knight and Day	John Fitzgerald		
2011	Green Lantern	Dr. Hector Hammond		
2012	Robot & Frank	Robot (voice)		
2013	Lovelace	Chuck Traynor		
2013	Very Good Girls	Fitzsimmons		
2013	Night Moves	Harmon		
2013	Blue Jasmine	Dwight Westlake		
2014	Pawn Sacrifice	William Lombardy		
2015	Experimenter	Stanley Milgram		
2015	Black Mass	Brian Halloran		
2016	Jackie	Robert F. Kennedy		
2016	The Magnificent Seven	Bartholomew Bogue		
2017	Loving Pablo	Shepard		
2018	The Lie	Jay Logan		
2019	The Sound of Silence	Peter Lucian		
2019	Mr Jones	Walter Duranty		
2019	Human Capital	Quint Manning		
2020	Best Summer Ever	Camera Man	Also executive producer	
2021	The Lost Daughter	Professor Hardy		
2021	The Guilty	Henry Fisher (voice)		
2021	The Survivor	Emory Anderson		
2022	The Batman	Gil Colson		
2023	Pet Shop Days	Phil		
2023	Memory	Saul		
2023	Coup!	Floyd Monk		
2024	September 5	Roone Arledge		
2026	The Bride!	Detective Jake Wiles		
2026	Flesh Impact	Director	Short film	
TBA	Road House 2 †	TBA	Post-production	

Key
†	Denotes films that have not yet been released

=== Television ===
Year	Title	Role	Notes	Refs.
1995	Law & Order	Josh Strand	Episode: "Paranoia"	
1997	New York Undercover	Donald Jones	Episode: "School's Out"	
1997	Subway Stories: Tales from the Underground	Boy #1	Television movie	
1999	Freak City	Cal Jackson	Television movie	
1999	Cracker	Spencer Trent	Episode: "The Club"	
2005	Statler and Waldorf: From the Balcony	Himself (cameo)	Web series	
2006	Saturday Night Live	Himself (host)	Episode: "Peter Sarsgaard/The Strokes"	
2010	Saturday Night Live	Boogerman	Episode: "Amy Poehler/Katy Perry"	
2013	The Killing	Ray Seward	10 episodes	
2015	The Slap	Hector Apostolou	Miniseries; 8 episodes	
2017	Wormwood	Frank Olson	Miniseries; 6 episodes	
2018	The Looming Tower	Martin Schmidt	Miniseries; 10 episodes	
2020	Interrogation	Det. David Russell	10 episodes	
2020	Homemade	Frank	Episode: "Penelope"	
2021	Dopesick	Rick Mountcastle	Miniseries	
2024	Presumed Innocent	Tommy Molto	8 episodes	
2026	DTF St. Louis	Christopher Spurce/"Modern Love"	4 episodes	
2027	Neuromancer †	John Ashpool	Upcoming series	
2027	The Last of Us †	Amon	Recurring (season 3)	

=== Theatre ===
Year	Title	Role	Venue	Refs.
1995	Laura Dennis	Harvey Griswold	Signature Theatre	
1996	Kingdom of Earth	Performer	Greenwich House	
2002	Burn This	Pale	Union Square Theatre	
2008	The Seagull	Boris Trigorin	Walter Kerr Theatre	
2009	Uncle Vanya	Astrov/Mikhail Lvovich	Classic Stage Company	
2011	Three Sisters	Vershinin	Classic Stage Company	
2015	Hamlet	Hamlet	Classic Stage Company	

== Awards and nominations ==
Year	Award	Category	Work	Result	Refs.
2000	St. Louis International Film Festival	Emerging Actor Award	N/A	Won	
2003	Boston Society of Film Critics Awards	Best Supporting Actor	Shattered Glass	Won	
2003	Village Voice Film Poll	Best Supporting Actor	Shattered Glass	Nominated	
2003	Southeastern Film Critics Association Awards	Best Supporting Actor	Shattered Glass	Nominated	
2003	Seattle Film Critics Awards	Best Supporting Actor	Shattered Glass	Nominated	
2003	San Francisco Film Critics Circle	Best Supporting Actor	Shattered Glass	Won	
2003	Toronto Film Critics Association Awards	Best Supporting Performance – Male	Shattered Glass	Won	
2003	Washington D.C. Area Film Critics Association	Best Supporting Actor	Shattered Glass	Nominated	
2004	Independent Spirit Awards	Best Supporting Male	Shattered Glass	Nominated	
2004	Dallas–Fort Worth Film Critics Association	Best Supporting Actor	Shattered Glass	Nominated	
2004	Central Ohio Film Critics Association	Best Supporting Actor	Shattered Glass	Nominated	
2004	Kansas City Film Critics Circle Awards	Best Supporting Actor	Shattered Glass	Won	
2004	Chlotrudis Awards	Best Supporting Actor	Shattered Glass	Won	
2004	Chicago Film Critics Association Awards	Best Supporting Actor	Shattered Glass	Nominated	
2004	Las Palmas Film Festival	Best Actor	Shattered Glass	Won	
2004	National Society of Film Critics Awards	Best Supporting Actor	Shattered Glass	Won	
2004	Online Film Critics Society Awards	Best Supporting Actor	Shattered Glass	Won	
2004	Online Film & Television Association	Best Supporting Actor	Shattered Glass	Nominated	
2004	Golden Globe Awards	Best Supporting Actor – Motion Picture	Shattered Glass	Nominated	
2004	International Cinephile Society	Best Supporting Actor	Shattered Glass	2nd place	
2004	Stockholm International Film Festival	Best Actor	Garden State	Won	
2004	Golden Schmoes Awards	Best Supporting Actor of the Year	Garden State	Nominated	
2004	Satellite Awards	Best Actor in a Supporting Role – Drama	Kinsey	Nominated	
2005	Critics' Choice Awards	Best Supporting Actor	Kinsey	Nominated	
2005	Dallas–Fort Worth Film Critics Association	Best Supporting Actor	Kinsey	Nominated	
2005	Glitter Awards	Best Supporting Actor	Kinsey	Won	
2005	Independent Spirit Awards	Best Supporting Male	Kinsey	Nominated	
2005	Online Film Critics Society Awards	Best Supporting Actor	Kinsey	Nominated	
2005	Chlotrudis Awards	Best Supporting Actor	Kinsey	Nominated	
2005	Online Film & Television Association	Best Supporting Actor	Kinsey	Nominated	
2005	Satellite Awards	Best Actor in a Supporting Role	Garden State	Nominated	
2005	Satellite Awards	Best Actor in a Supporting Role – Drama	Jarhead	Nominated	
2005	Washington D.C. Area Film Critics Association	Best Supporting Actor	Jarhead	Nominated	
2005	Women's Image Network Awards	Actor in Film	Flightplan	Nominated	
2009	Alliance of Women Film Journalists	Best Depiction of Nudity, Sexuality, or Seduction (shared with Carey Mulligan)	An Education	Won	
2010	Screen Actors Guild Awards	Outstanding Cast in a Motion Picture	An Education	Nominated	
2010	Santa Barbara International Film Festival	Cinema Vanguard Award	An Education	Won	
2013	Satellite Awards	Best Supporting Actor – Television	The Killing	Nominated	
2014	Critics' Choice Television Awards	Best Supporting Actor – Drama Series	The Killing	Nominated	
2014	Gold Derby Awards	Best Supporting Actor – Drama	The Killing	Nominated	
2014	Gold Derby Awards	Ensemble Cast	Blue Jasmine	Nominated	
2015	Gotham Awards	Best Actor	Experimenter	Nominated	
2015	Village Voice Film Poll	Best Actor	Experimenter	4th place	
2019	Critics' Choice Television Awards	Best Supporting Actor – Limited Series	The Looming Tower	Nominated	
2021	Primetime Emmy Awards	Outstanding Supporting Actor in a Limited or Anthology Series or Movie	Dopesick	Nominated	
2023	Venice International Film Festival	Volpi Cup for Best Actor	Memory	Won	
2025	Karlovy Vary International Film Festival	Festival President's Award		Honoured	
2025	Primetime Emmy Awards	Outstanding Supporting Actor in a Limited or Anthology Series or Movie	Presumed Innocent	Nominated	
(Source:)					
