= Clyde Martin =

American sexologist (1918–2014)

Clyde E. Martin
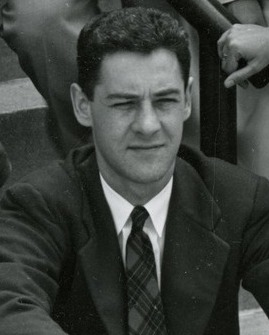
- Martin in 1953
- Born: January 2, 1918
- Died: December 5, 2014 (aged 96)
- Education: Indiana University Bloomington; Johns Hopkins University (Ph.D.)
- Known for: Co-authoring the Kinsey Reports
- Spouse: Alice Roberts Jones (m. 1942)
- Children: 2
- Scientific career
- Fields: Sexology; gerontology; sociology; economics
- Workplaces: Institute for Sex Research; Francis Scott Key Medical Center

Clyde E. Martin (January 2, 1918 – December 5, 2014) was an American sexologist. He was an assistant to Alfred Kinsey on the Kinsey Reports and served as a co-author on Sexual Behavior in the Human Male and Sexual Behavior in the Human Female.

== Career ==
Martin commenced study in economics at Indiana University Bloomington in 1937. Soon after in December 1938 Martin actively sought out Kinsey and gave Kinsey his sexual history. The pair formed a bond, and Kinsey offered the cash-strapped Martin work in his garden. From spring 1939, he was assisting Kinsey with tabulation of his sexual history surveys. In 1941 when funding for the project was received from the National Research Council, Martin became the first researcher hired by the project. In 1960 he resigned from the Institute for Sex Research to pursue his doctoral degree, receiving his Ph.D. (in social relations) from Johns Hopkins University in 1966. From 1966 until 1989, he conducted research, specializing in gerontology and sociology at the Francis Scott Key Medical Center in Baltimore, Maryland. He retired in 1989, and died on 5 December 2014, aged 96.

== Relationships ==
In May 1942, Martin married his girlfriend, Alice, in the garden of the Kinseys' house. Before marrying, he had a sexual relationship with Alfred Kinsey.

== In the media ==
- The 2003 musical Dr. Sex focuses on the relationship between Martin, Kinsey and his wife, with the character of Wally Matthews being based on Martin, Martin and Kinsey sharing Kinsey's wife as sex partner.
- The 2004 biographical film Kinsey, written and directed by Bill Condon, stars Peter Sarsgaard as Martin.
