= Kinsey scale =

Scale for measuring sexual orientation

Kinsey scale of sexual responses, indicating degrees of sexual orientation

The Kinsey scale, also called the Heterosexual–Homosexual Rating Scale, is used in research to describe a person's sexual orientation based on one's experience or response at a given time. The scale typically ranges from 0, meaning exclusively heterosexual, to a 6, meaning exclusively homosexual. In both the male and female volumes of the Kinsey Reports, an additional grade, listed as "X", indicated "no socio-sexual contacts or reactions" (asexuality). The reports were first published in Sexual Behavior in the Human Male (1948) by Alfred Kinsey, Wardell Pomeroy, and others, and were also prominent in the complementary work Sexual Behavior in the Human Female (1953).

== History ==
Alfred Kinsey, the creator of the Kinsey scale, is known as "the father of the sexual revolution." The Kinsey scale was created in order to demonstrate that sexuality does not fit into two strict categories: homosexual and heterosexual. Instead, Kinsey believed that sexuality is fluid and subject to change over time.

Rather than using sociocultural labels, Kinsey primarily used assessments of behavior in order to rate individuals on the scale. Kinsey's first rating scale had thirty categories that represented thirty different case studies, but his final scale has only seven categories. Over 8,000 interviews were conducted throughout his research.

Introducing the scale, Kinsey wrote:

Males do not represent two discrete populations, heterosexual and homosexual. The world is not to be divided into sheep and goats. It is a fundamental of taxonomy that nature rarely deals with discrete categories... The living world is a continuum in each and every one of its aspects. While emphasizing the continuity of the gradations between exclusively heterosexual and exclusively homosexual histories, it has seemed desirable to develop some sort of classification which could be based on the relative amounts of heterosexual and homosexual experience or response in each history [...] An individual may be assigned a position on this scale, for each period in his life. [...] A seven-point scale comes nearer to showing the many gradations that actually exist.

== Table of the scale ==
The Kinsey scale ranges from 0 for those interviewed who solely had desires for or sexual experiences with the opposite sex, to 6 for those who had exclusively same sex desires or experiences, and 1–5 for those who had varying levels of desire or experiences with both sexes, including "incidental" or "occasional" desire for sexual activity with the same sex. It did not reference whether they "identified" as heterosexual, bisexual, or homosexual.

Rating	Description
0	Exclusively heterosexual
1	Predominantly heterosexual, only incidentally homosexual
2	Predominantly heterosexual, but more than incidentally homosexual
3	Equally heterosexual and homosexual
4	Predominantly homosexual, but more than incidentally heterosexual
5	Predominantly homosexual, only incidentally heterosexual
6	Exclusively homosexual
X	No socio-sexual contacts or reactions

Kinsey recognized that the seven categories of the scale could not fully capture every individual's sexuality. He wrote that "it should be recognized that the reality includes individuals of every intermediate type, lying in a continuum between the two extremes and between each and every category on the scale." Although sociologists Martin S. Weinberg and Colin J. Williams write that, in principle, people who rank anywhere from 1 to 5 could be considered bisexual, Kinsey disliked the use of the term bisexual to describe individuals who engage in sexual activity with both men and women, preferring to use bisexual in its original, biological sense as hermaphroditic; he stated, "Until it is demonstrated [that] taste in a sexual relation is dependent upon the individual containing within his anatomy both male and female structures, or male and female physiological capacities, it is unfortunate to call such individuals bisexual."

Psychologist Jim McKnight writes that while the idea that bisexuality is a form of sexual orientation intermediate between homosexuality and heterosexuality is implicit in the Kinsey scale, that conception has been "severely challenged" since the publication of Homosexualities: A Study of Diversity Among Men and Women (1978) by Weinberg and the psychologist Alan P. Bell. Furthermore, although the additional X grade used to mean "no socio-sexual contacts or reactions" is today described as asexuality, psychologist Justin J. Lehmiller stated, "the Kinsey X classification emphasized a lack of sexual behavior, whereas the modern definition of asexuality emphasizes a lack of sexual attraction. As such, the Kinsey Scale may not be sufficient for accurate classification of asexuality."

== Findings ==
=== Kinsey reports ===
The Kinsey Reports are two published works, Sexual Behavior in the Human Male (1948) and Sexual Behavior in the Human Female (1953). These reports discuss the sexual attractions, behaviors, and development of human men and women. The data to scale the participants comes from their "psychosexual responses and/or overt experience" in relation to sexual attraction and activity with the same and opposite sexes. The inclusion of psychosexual responses allows someone with less sexual experience to rank evenly with someone of greater sexual experience.

- Men: 11.6% of white men aged 20–35 were given a rating of 3 for this period of their lives. The study also reported that 10% of American men surveyed were "more or less exclusively homosexual for at least three years between the ages of 16 and 55" (in the 5 to 6 range).
- Women: 7% of single women aged 20–35 and 4% of previously married women aged 20–35 were given a rating of 3 for this period of their lives. 2% to 6% of women, aged 20–35, were given a rating of 5 and 1% to 3% of unmarried women aged 20–35 were rated as 6.

The results found in Sexual Behavior in the Human Female show a higher number of men who lean towards homosexuality than recorded for the women. Kinsey addresses that the result is contrary to reports that women have more homosexual leanings than men. He posits that such reports are due to the "wishful thinking on the part of such heterosexual males."

== Impact and later developments ==
=== General ===
The Kinsey scale is credited as one of the first attempts to "acknowledge the diversity and fluidity of human sexual behavior" by illustrating that "sexuality does not fall neatly into the dichotomous categories of exclusively heterosexual or exclusively homosexual." Most studies regarding homosexuality, at the time, were conducted by medical professionals who were sought out by individuals that wanted to change their sexual orientation. Alfred Kinsey's publications on human sexuality, which encompasses the Kinsey scale, were widely advertised and had a huge impact on society's modern conceptions of sexuality, post–World War II.

Galupo et al. argued, "Despite the availability of the Kinsey Scale, assessment via sociocultural labels (i.e., heterosexual, homosexual, and bisexual) is the predominant modality for determining the sexual orientation of research participants." Many sexologists see the Kinsey scale as relevant to sexual orientation, but not comprehensive enough to cover all sexual identity aspects. Measures of sexual orientation do not always correlate with individuals' self-identification labels. As such, sexual identity involves more than one component and may also involve biological sex and gender identity. However, Bullough et al. argued that this "wide-scale public discussion of human sexuality" ultimately led Americans to challenge traditional heteronormative behaviors. His research and findings encouraged gay men and lesbians to come out by debunking much of the stigma revolved around homosexuality.

Others have further defined the scale. In 1980, Michael Storms proposed a two dimensional chart with an X and Y axis. This scale explicitly takes into account the case of asexuality and the simultaneous expression of hetero-eroticism and homo-eroticism. Fritz Klein, in his Klein Sexual Orientation Grid, included factors such as how orientation can change throughout a person's lifetime, as well as emotional and social orientation. Kinsey, Storm, and Klein are only three of more than 200 scales to measure and describe sexual orientation. For example, there are scales that rate homosexual behaviors from 1 to 14, and measures for gender, masculinity, femininity, and transgender identity.

=== Surveys and other studies ===
There have been similar studies using a scale from 0 to 10. In such studies, the person would be asked a question such as "If 0 is completely gay and 10 is completely hetero, what is your orientation number?".

A study published in 2014 aimed to explore "sexual minority individuals' qualitative responses regarding the ways in which the Kinsey Scale [...] captures (or fail to capture) their sexuality." Participants completed the [Kinsey] scale and then were asked to respond to the following question: "In what ways did this scale capture or fail to capture your sexuality?" "A diverse sample of sexual minority participants, including individuals who (1) identify outside the traditional sexual orientation labels (i.e. pansexual, queer, fluid, asexual) and (2) identify as transgender, were recruited to complete an online questionnaire." Participants represented a convenience sample of 285 individuals who self-identified as non-heterosexual. "Approximately one third of participants self-identified primarily as monosexual (31.5%), whereas 65.8% identified as nonmonosexual, and 2.8% identified as asexual. Monosexual participants represented those who self-identified as lesbian (18.5%) or gay (12.2%) or homosexual (0.8%). Nonmonosexual participants included bisexual (24.1%), pansexual (16.8%), queer (19.6%), and fluid (1.4%) participants. A small minority of participants identified as 'other' (3.8%)." Participants represented all regions of the continental United States. For this study, the use of "X" was intended to describe asexuality or individuals who identify as nonsexual.

A study published in 2017 questioned how people who do not identify as heterosexual felt about their representation on the Kinsey scale. The study takes a group of minority individuals who sexually identify as something other than heterosexual, and has them rate the Kinsey scale according to how well they feel represented by their value. Each group gave it a rating between 1 and 5. In the results, the group that rated the scale the highest was the group that identified as lesbian or gay with a rating of 4.66. The bisexual group rated it lower at 3.78, and the pansexual/queer group gave it the lowest rating at 2.68. Another trend that the study noted was that cisgender participants on average rated themselves higher on the scale than transgender participants (where the authors use transgender as a category to describe participants of various trans and non-binary identities). Namely, the cisgender participants average rating was 4.09 while the transgender participants was 2.78. The authors also found that trans and non-binary participants rated the Kinsey scale to be a less valid measure of their sexual orientation than the cisgender participants, due to its reliance on binary terminology.

== See also ==
- Asexuality
- Bi-curious
- Bisexual erasure
- Bisexuality
- Gay sexual practices
- Gender binary
- Heterosexual–homosexual continuum
- Lesbian sexual practices
- Uranismus
