= Homosexualities =

1978 book by Alan P. Bell and Martin S. Weinberg

Homosexualities: A Study of Diversity Among Men and Women
- Cover of the first edition
- Authors: Alan P. Bell; Martin S. Weinberg
- Language: English
- Subject: Homosexuality
- Publisher: Simon & Schuster
- Publication date: 1978
- Publication place: United States
- Media type: Print (Hardcover and Paperback)
- Pages: 505
- ISBN: 978-0671251505

Homosexualities: A Study of Diversity Among Men and Women (1978) is a book by the psychologist Alan P. Bell and the sociologist Martin S. Weinberg in which the authors argue that homosexuality is not necessarily related to pathology and divide homosexuals into five types. Together with Homosexuality: An Annotated Bibliography (1972), it is part of a series of books that culminated in the publication of Sexual Preference in 1981. The work was a publication of the Institute for Sex Research.

The book received much attention and mixed reviews. It received praise for its authors' attempts to discredit stereotypes about homosexuals, became influential, and has been seen as a classic work. However, it was criticized for its authors' sampling methods and their typology of homosexuals, which has been seen as arbitrary and misleading. Commentators also questioned Bell and Weinberg's presentation of the work as a definitive study of homosexuality. Some commentators suggested that some of Bell and Weinberg's findings were obvious and that their study was not needed to establish them, and critics charged that they drew conclusions not justified by their data. Some of Bell and Weinberg's findings, such as those about gay men's sexual behavior, have become dated due to social changes since the 1970s, such as those brought about by the AIDS epidemic and the progress of the gay rights movement.

== Summary ==
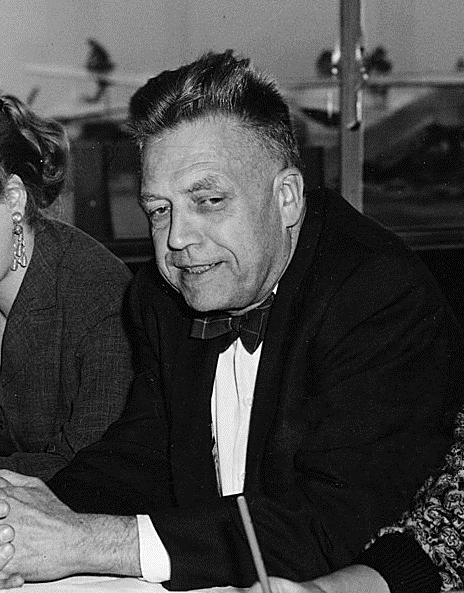
Sex researcher Alfred Kinsey.

Discussing the background to Homosexualities, Bell and Weinberg write that the sex researcher Alfred Kinsey had intended to publish a study of homosexuality to complement the two volumes of the Kinsey Reports, but died before being able to produce such a volume. Following Kinsey's death, the Institute for Sex Research became involved in other projects and did not focus its attention on homosexuality again until the late 1960s. Stanley Yolles of the National Institute of Mental Health established the National Institute of Mental Health Task Force on Homosexuality, which held its first meeting in 1967, and decided that further research into homosexuality was needed. The NIMH Task Force invited the Institute for Sex Research to submit a proposal for a comprehensive study of the development of homosexuality. The institute's proposal, based upon many of the NIMH Task Force's recommendations, was modified after consultation with NIMH officials. The book's direct predecessor was Patterns of Adjustment in Deviant Populations, a 1967 survey of white gay men in Chicago designed by Bell and Gebhard and funded by NIMH. This pilot study contained many questions identical to those used in Homosexualities.

Bell and Weinberg, during the initial stages of their work, consulted with numerous experts on homosexuality who often held views quite different from theirs. Those listed as contributors to the study include the ethologist Frank A. Beach, the psychoanalyst Irving Bieber, Wainwright Churchill, the psychologist Albert Ellis, the anthropologist Paul Gebhard, the psychologist Evelyn Hooker, the sociologist Laud Humphreys, the psychiatrist Judd Marmor, the sexologist Wardell Pomeroy, the sociologist Edward Sagarin, the psychiatrist Robert Stoller, the psychologist Clarence Arthur Tripp, and the sociologist Colin J. Williams. Bell and Weinberg comment that, "Our correspondence and personal meetings with these individuals were of great help to us in constructing a viable interview schedule. While the final instrument, devised over many meetings of various Institute personnel, did not entirely please or represent the views of any one person associated with it, the interview schedule in its final form was the result of endless discussions and sometimes painful compromise on the part of many highly committed people."

Bell and Weinberg write that their study has several purposes, including describing homosexual sexual behavior, examining stereotypes about homosexuals, and exploring "the relationship between homosexuals' sexual life-styles and their social and psychological adjustment". They note that their work is based on a nonrepresentative sample, and argue that a representative sample is unnecessary for their purposes. They also argue that several different types of homosexual should be distinguished. They write that Homosexualities is part of a series of books that resulted from what Bell and Weinberg called the San Francisco Study.

== Publication history ==
Homosexualities was first published by Simon & Schuster in 1978. The book was also published by the Macmillan Company of Australia Pty Ltd in 1978.A new edition was published in paperback by Touchstone on September 19, 1979.

== Reception ==
=== Overview ===
Homosexualities was influential and has been praised as an important study. The philosopher Lee C. Rice credited its authors with discrediting "myths about the gay personality". The psychologist William Paul and the sex researcher James D. Weinrich maintained that Homosexualities documented social diversity well and was the largest study conducted specifically on homosexuality, but that it was limited by the problems of trying to obtain a representative sample. The philosopher Timothy F. Murphy considered it useful despite its limitations, provided that it, like other studies, is regarded as part of a scientific process of "measuring the adequacy of hypotheses and evidence". Some of Bell and Weinberg's findings have been described as outdated. Paul and Weinrich suggested that because their data was collected in 1969, they may have missed "growing cultural developments in the gay younger generation of the late 1960s and early 1970s." The philosopher Michael Ruse suggested that the AIDS epidemic has probably made their findings about gay sexual behavior obsolete. Murphy observed that Bell and Weinberg studied people who came of age before gay liberation, and that probably a much smaller proportion of gays would now be dissatisfied with their sexual orientation or interested in attempting to change it through therapy. The philosopher John Corvino wrote that Homosexualities is the study most commonly cited to prove that gay men are sexually promiscuous, but that it was not based on a broad sample and that a more extensive 1994 study by the sociologist Edward Laumann produced different results. Laumann et al. argued that while Bell and Weinberg covered a wide range of sexual behaviors, their failure to use probability samples meant that their study "could not be used to estimate population rates." They nevertheless found Homosexualities valuable in planning their own study.

The historian Martin Duberman observed that in 1976 he heard a rumor that the study "would give renewed respectability to the long dominant but recently challenged psychoanalytic view (associated primarily with the work of Charles Socarides and Irving Bieber), that the parental configuration of absent/hostile/remote father and binding/suffocating/domineering mother was what produced gay sons." He related that when he met Bell that year and asked him whether this was true, Bell "squirmed uncomfortably" and gave "a long-winded, evasive reply." According to Duberman, "I finally got him [Bell] to say that he had tentatively concluded that "estrangement from the father (irrespective of the mother's "binding" love or lack of it) was likely to produce a homosexual son; and that estrangement from the mother could be directly correlated with a heterosexual outcome for the son." He wrote that Bell was "not amused" by his criticism of this conclusion. He added that Homosexualities surprised him because it "avoided the question of etiology" and "was a work of considerable substance." In 2002, Duberman was quoted as saying that the work resulted from "the most ambitious study of male homosexuality ever attempted", and that together with Sexual Preference (1981), it "refuted a large number of previous studies that gay men were social misfits". Bell and Weinberg, writing with the sociologist Sue Kiefer Hammersmith, described Sexual Preference as the culmination of a series of books that began with Homosexuality: An Annotated Bibliography in 1972 and included Homosexualities.

Judith A. Allen and her co-authors wrote that Homosexualities, like Sexual Preference, abandoned Kinsey's understanding of human sexuality by focusing on homosexual people rather than homosexual behavior and rejecting the idea that categorizing people as homosexual was problematic. The psychologist Jim McKnight stated that while the idea that bisexuality is a form of sexual orientation intermediate between homosexuality and heterosexuality is implicit in the Kinsey scale, that view was brought into question by the publication of Homosexualities. The philosopher Michael Levin criticized Bell and Weinberg for using a non-random sample. He also accused them of being credulous about their informants' reports, employing special pleading and circular reasoning, seeking to demonstrate preferred conclusions, and making misleading use of statistics. In his view, despite their intentions, their data suggests that homosexuality inevitably leads to unhappiness. He argued that their finding that most homosexuals reported that they were in good health was inconsistent with their finding that most homosexuals "spend 3 or more nights a week out." He also pointed to their findings that 27% of homosexuals experience "either some or a great deal of regret about being homosexual", that 56% of homosexuals "usually spend several hours or less with a partner", and that homosexuals tend to be sexually promiscuous, arguing that such promiscuity suggests "maladjustment and compulsivity". He argued that their finding that some homosexuals are "close-coupled" did not show that homosexuality is not pathological, and that they misled their readers by claiming that "close-coupled homosexuals are on average as happy and well-adjusted as heterosexuals." The psychologists Stanton L. Jones and Mark A. Yarhouse observed that the conclusions of the authors of Homosexualities were based on convenience samples, which have no known representativeness. They nevertheless consulted Bell and Weinberg's interview protocols when developing a questionnaire for their own study of ex-gays.

The gay rights activist Dennis Altman described Homosexualities as a typical example of how research into homosexuality is justified in terms of legitimizing the homosexual lifestyle. He noted that Bell and Weinberg's finding that homosexuality is not necessarily related to pathology did not call into question either the concept of pathology or the ability of psychologists to determine it. He suggested that like similar studies, Homosexualities appealed to "people who need to combat the way we have been stigmatized by one set of experts with the reassurances of another." He considered Bell and Weinberg "influenced by conventional assumptions about relationships and happiness." The psychologist John Paul De Cecco dismissed the book, writing that while Bell and Weinberg presented it as definitive, it suffered from the "theoretical blindness" that has dominated research on homosexuality in the United States since the early 1970s. He contrasted it unfavorably with the work of European thinkers whom he credited with "provocative theoretical speculations": the philosophers Michel Foucault and Guy Hocquenghem, the gay rights activist Mario Mieli, the sexologist Martin Dannecker, and the sociologist Jeffrey Weeks.

=== Reviews ===
Homosexualities received positive reviews from the novelist Richard Hall in The New Republic, John H. Curtis in the American Journal of Family Therapy, and Clarissa K. Wittenberg in Psychiatric News, mixed reviews from Duberman in The New York Times, Stephen F. Morin in Sex Roles, and Russell Boxley and Joseph M. Carrier in the Journal of Homosexuality, and a negative review from Michael Lynch in The Body Politic. The book was also reviewed by Norman C. Murphy in The Advocate.

Hall praised the book for helping to counter the image of homosexuals as "dysfunctionals", and believed that it would be useful for jurists, employers, educators, and legislators. However, he considered its authors' conclusion that there is no necessary connection between homosexuality and unhappiness "a truism of the kind that any good novelist could flesh out in a year or less", describing the fact that it took them ten years of research to support it as "a sad commentary on the cumbersome procedures of the social scientists." He argued that the fact that the study took so long to be published diminished its relevance, despite its authors' assertions to the contrary. He also criticized the work for its dryness and failure to provide case histories or any "feeling for the dynamics, the interactions of the lives described." He noted that despite the fact that some of the questions employed in the study were open-ended, there were "only brief and unenlightening answers." He questioned whether it was useful to classify homosexuals into different types. Curtis credited Bell and Weinberg with carefully investigating homosexuality and demonstrating that it had "no single lifestyle pattern". He wrote that Homosexualities would "become a standard reference work in the area of homosexuality in the future." Wittenberg wrote that the book was certain to become an instant classic and that it fully deserved this status.

Duberman characterized the book as "the most ambitious study" of male homosexuality yet attempted, but was critical of its authors' "sample techniques and simplistic typologies". He described their work as part of "sexology's mainstream", believing that while most gays would welcome their conclusion that gays differ little from "mainstream Americans", gay radicals would be angered. He suggested that they offered a "sanitized" version of gay experience.

Morin described the book as a "long-awaited publication", but did not consider its authors' findings surprising. He wrote that they appeared to have found "difficulty in dealing with the diversity of experiences that they found among their gay respondents". While appreciating their attempts to discredit stereotypes about homosexuals, he found their division of homosexuals into different "types" to be in effect the creation of a new set of stereotypes. He called their typology of homosexuals "arbitrary and misleading." He argued that while the book was a "fine historical document", its data only reflected the situation in San Francisco in 1969 and 1970. He denied that its authors had a representative sample, and suggested that a representative sample of homosexuals was impossible given that they were "basically an invisible population". He also accused the book's authors of drawing "conclusions well beyond their data." While he considered Homosexualities a helpful work, and useful on a political level, he did not consider it "a sophisticated research study". He wrote that the book was "disappointing and consistent with the downward trend in the quality of reports emanating from the Institute for Sex Research", and criticized its authors for ignoring "issues of growth and the ways in which diversity may lead to insights which might be helpful to all men and women exploring the creative violation of sex roles."

Boxley considered the book a "significant analytic work in the area of sex research." In his view, its most impressive contribution was its "development of a homosexual typology", which helped to provide "a needed classification of diversity within the homosexuality community". However, he believed that the work otherwise had little that was new, and that its typology focused too much on sex and too little on other aspects of social experience. He also wrote that while Bell and Weinberg presented Homosexualities as a definitive study of homosexuality in the United States, the work as a whole had "little sense of unity". He did not consider its use of a heterosexual group for comparative purposes helpful. He criticized Bell and Weinberg for failing to explore how social stigma affected the adjustment of its homosexual subjects, and for providing insufficient attention to how the "homosexual community" caused "support as well as stress to the homosexual." He argued that their "rigid" approach created an impression of a "fragmented and oversimplified analysis" and came "at the expense of providing a complete picture of homosexual behavior." In his view, the reliability of their data was sometimes open to question, and their "psychological adjustment measures" were "somewhat crude". He also criticized the work for legitimizing stereotypes such as "the hypersexuality of black male and female homosexuals".

Carrier criticized Bell and Weinberg for continuing "the mainstream focus of research on that segment of the population most closely identified with the middle-class American culture." He questioned their "knowledge of the black subculture", and suggested that the black sample of their study might not be adequate "to represent the behavior of black homosexual females and males who are most closely identified" with the black subculture. He criticized them for paying insufficient attention to the black homosexual scene. Nevertheless, he believed that the study presented "valuable data on human sexual behavior" and would "be of use to all serious researchers in the area of human sexuality."

Lynch argued that Homosexualities was in part an attempt by its authors to overcome statistical weaknesses in the work of Kinsey and his colleagues, and that as a result they had put more effort into "data processing" than into "understanding the premises and conclusions of the study." He suggested that they were "sometimes silently at odds" with Kinsey and his colleagues, and that they had limited their accomplishments by beginning with an attempt to test negative stereotypes about gay people. He criticized them for using language that contained implied value judgments, and suggested that their division of homosexuals into five different "types" was a value-laden classification. He disagreed with what he considered their attempt to "demote the sense of unified or shared experience among gays", and criticized their failure to "attempt to delineate the experience we all share." He maintained that because their respondents were mainly middle class, they were unable to further explore Kinsey's findings about "the division of sexual and sex-related behavior based on class." He considered them naive to believe that Homosexualities would make legislators and community leaders change their negative attitudes to gay people.

== See also ==
- Biology and sexual orientation
- Environment and sexual orientation
- Gay Science
- Homosexuality: A Philosophical Inquiry
- Homosexuality: Social, Psychological, and Biological Issues
