= Irving Bieber =

American psychoanalyst (1909–1991)

- Born: 1909; New York City, United States
- Died: 1991 (aged 81–82); New York City, U.S.
- Education: New York University (BA, MD)
- Occupation: Psychoanalyst

Irving Bieber (/ˈbiːbər/; 1909 – August 27, 1991) was an American psychoanalyst, best known for his study Homosexuality: A Psychoanalytic Study of Male Homosexuals (1962), in which Bieber took the position that homosexuality is an acquired trait.

== Life and career ==
Irving Bieber was born in New York City. He graduated from New York University, where he was elected to Phi Beta Kappa, and earned a Doctor of Medicine (M.D.) in 1930 from New York University Medical College, where he was a member of Alpha Omega Alpha and, at age 22, the youngest in the graduating class.

Bieber went on to work at Yale Medical College, New York University, and starting in 1953 at the New York Medical College, where he taught a course in psychoanalysis. Bieber was, along with Lionel Ovesey and Charles Socarides, one of the most influential American psychoanalysts who postulated that gay men can be treated successfully. Bieber's 1962 book Homosexuality: A Psychoanalytic Study of Male Homosexuals was a counter reaction to the 1948 Kinsey Report on male sexual behavior. It remained the leading study on homosexuality until homosexuality was removed from DSM-III in 1973.

In 1970, Bieber attended a meeting of the American Psychiatric Association in San Francisco that was protested by members of the Gay Liberation Front. According to Socarides, Bieber, who felt he had "been working all these years to help these people", "took this very hard." In 1973, the same year the American Psychiatric Association removed homosexuality from its list of mental disorders, Bieber told an interviewer that "a homosexual is a person whose heterosexual function is crippled, like the legs of a polio victim." When Alan P. Bell, Martin S. Weinberg, and Sue Kiefer Hammersmith's study Sexual Preference was published in 1981, Bieber declared that its findings were "totally disparate" with his experience from psychiatric consultation.

Bieber arranged a partial translation into English of a paper by the Hungarian pediatrician S. Lindner, who had reported a systematic study of sucking. Sigmund Freud had used Lindner's observation that sensual sucking seems to absorb the attention completely and leads to either sleep or an orgasm-like response to develop his theory of infantile sexuality. Bieber pointed out what he saw as inaccuracies in Freud's use of this paper.

Bieber died in Manhattan on August 27, 1991.

== Books ==
=== Homosexuality: A Psychoanalytic Study of Male Homosexuals ===
A review by Social Work called the study "an important book", also stating that "...the authors present a very meaningful understanding of the underlying dynamics of this symptom and factors relevant to etiology". In 1979 the study was actualized and republished. The authors stated that "reversal estimates now range from 30% to an optimistic 50%. A shift to heterosexuality does not mean that the potential for homosexual arousal has been totally extinguished, though in some cases this does occur." They also concluded that homosexual adaptation is primarily related to "destructive family relationships and other deleterious interpersonal influences".

The book has been criticized for examining homosexuals already in analytic treatment as opposed to non-patient heterosexuals. It has been suggested that the study informed stereotypes later promulgated by the media. For example, in 1964 Life magazine, a general-interest and light entertainment magazine, featured an article on homosexuals and smothering mothers directly inspired by this study.

== Bibliography ==
- Homosexuality: A Psychoanalytic Study of Male Homosexuals, 1962
- Cognitive Psychoanalysis: Cognitive Processes in Psychopathology, 1980

== See also ==
- Conversion therapy
- Sexual orientation change efforts
