= Bisexuality =

Sexual attraction to more than one gender

Bisexual flag, designed by Michael Page in 1998

Bisexuality is defined as having romantic attraction, sexual attraction, or sexual behavior towards more than one gender or attraction that is not limited by sex or gender.

The term bisexuality originated in early sexology as a descriptor for those with both homosexual and heterosexual attraction and was coined in the 19th century in German by Richard von Krafft-Ebing in his Psychopathia Sexualis, then introduced to English by Charles Gilbert Chaddock in his 1892 translation.

Bisexual (or bi) was reclaimed as a sexual orientation label in the 1960s and has been defined in a variety of ways by the bisexual community, including as attraction regardless of gender or sex, attraction existing beyond the gender and sexual orientation binary, attraction to men and women, attraction to more than one gender or sex, attraction to people of similar/same and different/other genders, and attraction with gender being an irrelevant factor.

Scientists do not know the exact determinants of sexual orientation, but they theorize that it is caused by a complex interplay of genetic, hormonal, and environmental influences, and do not view it as a choice. Although no single theory on the cause of sexual orientation has yet gained widespread support, scientists favor biologically based theories. There is considerably more evidence supporting nonsocial, biological causes of sexual orientation than social ones, especially for males.

Bisexuality has been observed in various human societies, as well as elsewhere in the animal kingdom, throughout recorded history.

== Definitions ==
=== Sexual orientation, identity, and behavior ===
According to the American Institute of Bisexuality, "Bisexuality is an umbrella term that covers a wide range of identities, terms, attractions, and behaviors that all fit the scientific definition of bisexuality... it is a general and inclusive term that encompasses everyone; all sexes and all genders. That does not mean that bi people are attracted to everyone, merely that bi people's attractions aren't limited by sex or gender."

The bisexual activist Robyn Ochs defines bisexuality as "the potential to be attracted—romantically and/or sexually—to people of more than one sex and/or gender, not necessarily at the same time, not necessarily in the same way, and not necessarily to the same degree."

The American Psychological Association states that "sexual orientation falls along a continuum. In other words, someone does not have to be exclusively homosexual or heterosexual, but can feel varying degrees of both. Sexual orientation develops across a person's lifetime–different people realize at different points in their lives that they are heterosexual, bisexual or homosexual." Attraction can take numerous forms for bisexuals, such as sexual, romantic, emotional, or physical.

Sexual attraction, behavior, and identity may also be incongruent, as sexual attraction or behavior may not necessarily be consistent with identity. Some individuals identify themselves as heterosexual, homosexual, or bisexual without having had any sexual experience. Others have had homosexual experiences but do not consider themselves to be gay, lesbian, or bisexual. Likewise, self-identified gay or lesbian individuals may occasionally sexually interact with members of the opposite sex but do not identify as bisexual. The terms queer, polysexual, heteroflexible, homoflexible, men who have sex with men and women who have sex with women may also be used to describe sexual identity or identify sexual behavior. Sometimes the phrase bisexual umbrella, or bisexual community, is used to describe any non-monosexual behaviors, attractions, and identities, usually for purposes of collective action and challenging monosexist cultural assumptions. The term "bisexual community" includes those who identify as bisexual, pansexual, omnisexual, biromantic, polysexual, or sexually fluid.

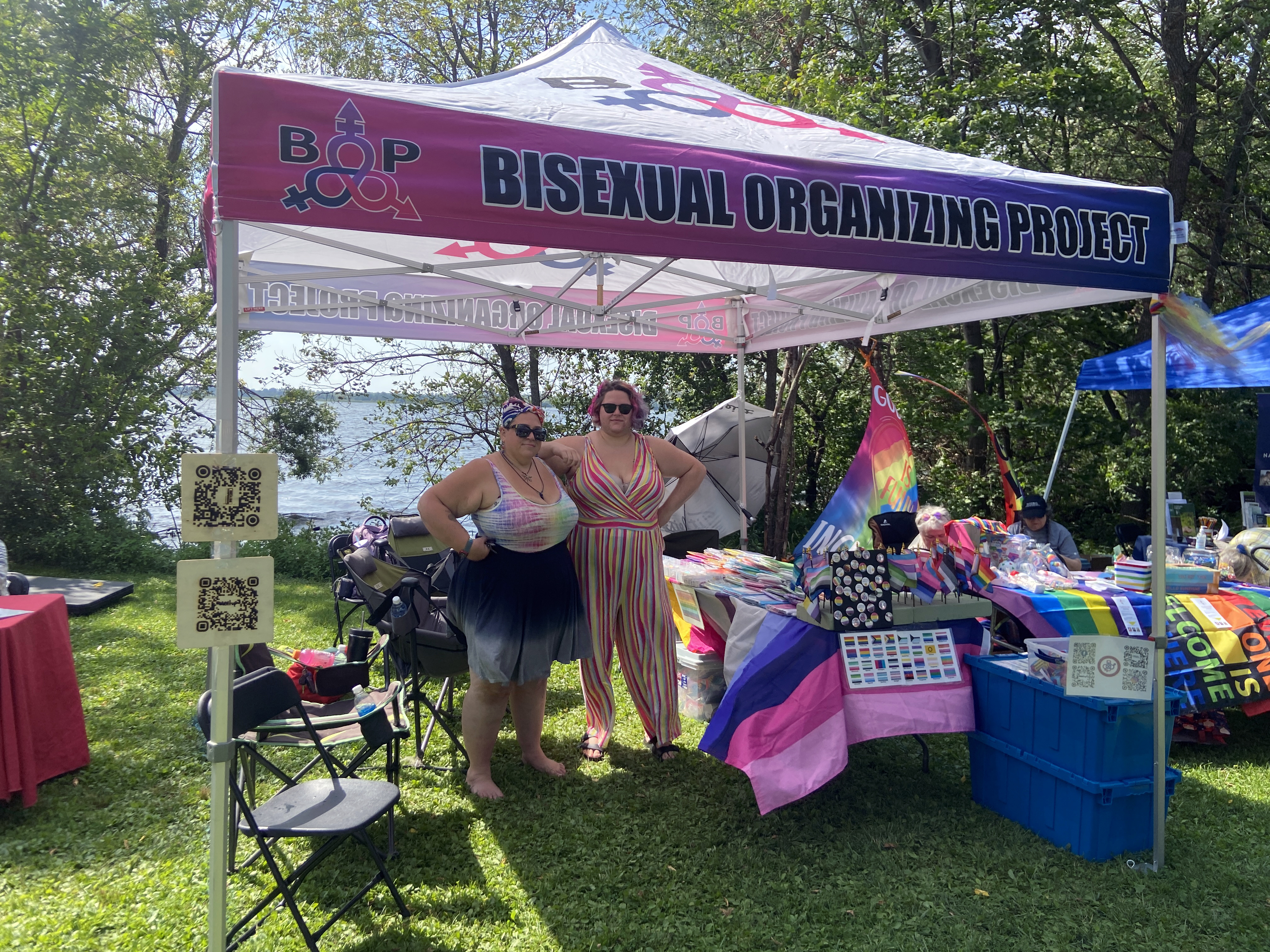
Bisexual Organizing Project booth at Bemidji Pride, Bemidji, Minnesota

Bisexuality as a transitional identity has also been examined. In a longitudinal study about sexual identity development among lesbian, gay, and bisexual (LGB) youths, Rosario et al. "found evidence of both considerable consistency and change in LGB sexual identity over time". Youths who had identified as both gay/lesbian and bisexual prior to baseline were approximately three times more likely to identify as gay/lesbian than as bisexual at subsequent assessments. Of youths who had identified only as bisexual at earlier assessments, 60 to 70 percent continued to thus identify, while approximately 30 to 40 percent assumed a gay/lesbian identity over time. Rosario et al. suggested that "although there were youths who consistently self-identified as bisexual throughout the study, for other youths, a bisexual identity served as a transitional identity to a subsequent gay/lesbian identity."

By contrast, a longitudinal study by Lisa M. Diamond, which followed women identifying as lesbian, bisexual, or unlabeled, found that "more women adopted bisexual/unlabeled identities than relinquished these identities", over a ten-year period. The study also found that "bisexual/unlabeled women had stable overall distributions of same-sex/other-sex attractions". Diamond has also studied male bisexuality, noting that survey research found "almost as many men transitioned at some point from a gay identity to a bisexual, queer or unlabeled one, as did from a bisexual identity to a gay identity."

There may also be a difference between sexual and romantic attractions in bisexuals over time. One study found that in the short term bisexual men and women were much more likely to change their sexual behavior than heterosexual or homosexual individuals. Bisexual men were less likely to have a change in romantic attraction, but those who did were more likely to have a greater change in sexual feelings, while bisexual women were more likely than bisexual men to have a change in romantic attraction. This suggests that sexual and romantic attraction is not fixed for bisexual individuals and changes over time.

=== Kinsey scale ===
In the 1940s, the zoologist Alfred Kinsey created a scale to measure the continuum of sexual orientation from heterosexuality to homosexuality. Kinsey studied human sexuality and argued that people have the capability of being hetero- or homosexual even if this trait does not present itself in the current circumstances. The Kinsey scale is used to describe a person's sexual experience or response at a given time. It ranges from 0, meaning exclusively heterosexual, to 6, meaning exclusively homosexual. People who rank anywhere from 2 to 4 are often considered bisexual; they are often not fully one extreme or the other. The sociologists Martin S. Weinberg and Colin J. Williams write that, in principle, people who rank anywhere from one to five could be considered bisexual.

Psychologist Jim McKnight writes that while the idea that bisexuality is a form of sexual orientation intermediate between homosexuality and heterosexuality is implicit in the Kinsey scale, that conception has been "severely challenged" since the publication of Homosexualities (1978), by Weinberg and the psychologist Alan P. Bell.

==== Criticism ====
The Kinsey scale is criticized for various reasons. One of the main reasons is the inverse relation in attraction to males and females that the Kinsey scale represents. The Kinsey scale implies that having a higher level attraction to one gender results in less attraction to the other, which some studies do not support. This aspect of the Kinsey scale can impact the results of studies that utilize the scale, as there is a biological difference between bisexuals and homosexuals.

=== Other scales ===
- Klein Sexual Orientation Grid
  - A more descriptive orientation grid that takes into account: Sexual attraction, sexual behavior, sexual fantasies, emotional preference, social preference, lifestyle preference, and self-identification. It also has different measures for certain variables and is not binary by design.
- Shively Scale
  - Measures physical and affectional attraction on two separate scales.
- Sell Assessment of Sexual Orientation
  - Measures sexual attraction, sexual orientation identity, and sexual behavior and reports the extent of all of those factors.
- Multidimensional Scale of Sexuality (MSS)
  - Uses nine categories to categorize bisexuality. These categories are evaluated on sexual behavior, sexual attraction, arousal to erotic material, emotional factors, and sexual dreams and fantasies. The combined answers to all of these questions make up the score.

== Demographics and prevalence ==
Scientific estimates as to the prevalence of bisexuality have varied from 0.7 to 8 percent. The Janus Report on Sexual Behavior, published in 1993, concluded that 5 percent of men and 3 percent of women considered themselves bisexual, while 4 percent of men and 2 percent of women considered themselves homosexual.

A 2002 survey in the United States by the National Center for Health Statistics found that 1.8 percent of men ages 18–44 considered themselves bisexual, 2.3 percent homosexual, and 3.9 percent as "something else". The same study found that 2.8 percent of women ages 18–44 considered themselves bisexual, 1.3 percent homosexual, and 3.8 percent as "something else". In 2007, an article in the Health section of The New York Times stated that "1.5 percent of American women and 1.7 percent of American men identify themselves [as] bisexual." Also in 2007, it was reported that 14.4 percent of young US women identified themselves as "not strictly heterosexual", with 5.6 percent of the men identifying as gay or bisexual. A study in the journal Biological Psychology in 2011 reported that there were men who identify themselves as bisexuals and who were aroused by both men and women. In the first large-scale government survey measuring Americans' sexual orientation, the NHIS reported in July 2014 that only 0.7 percent of Americans identify as bisexual.

A collection of recent Western surveys finds that about 10% of women and 4% of men identify as mostly heterosexual, 1% of women and 0.5% of men as bisexual, and 0.4% of women and 0.5% of men as mostly homosexual.

Across cultures, there is some variance in the prevalence of bisexual behavior, but there is no persuasive evidence that there is much variance in the rate of same-sex attraction. The World Health Organization estimates a worldwide prevalence of men who have sex with men between 3 and 16%, many of whom have sex with women as well.

A YouGov survey found that the proportion of young adults living in the United Kingdom identifying as bisexual surged 14 percentage points from 2015 to 2019.

== Studies, theories and social responses ==
There is no consensus among scientists about the exact reasons that an individual develops a heterosexual, bisexual or homosexual orientation. Although scientists favor biological models for the cause of sexual orientation, they do not believe that the development of sexual orientation is the result of any one factor. They generally believe that it is determined by a complex interplay of biological and environmental factors, and is shaped at an early age. There is considerably more evidence supporting nonsocial, biological causes of sexual orientation than social ones, especially for males. There is no substantive evidence that suggests parenting or early childhood experiences play a role with regard to sexual orientation. Most scientists do not believe that sexual orientation is a choice that can be changed at will.

In 2000, the American Psychiatric Association stated: "To date there are no replicated scientific studies supporting any specific biological etiology for homosexuality. Similarly, no specific psychosocial or family dynamic cause for homosexuality has been identified, including histories of childhood sexual abuse." Research into how sexual orientation may be determined by genetic or other prenatal factors plays a role in political and social debates about homosexuality, and also raises fears about genetic profiling and prenatal testing.

Magnus Hirschfeld argued that adult sexual orientation can be explained in terms of the bisexual nature of the developing fetus: he believed that in every embryo there is one rudimentary neutral center for attraction to males and another for attraction to females. In most fetuses, the center for attraction to the opposite sex developed while the center for attraction to the same sex regressed, but in fetuses that became homosexual, the reverse occurred. Simon LeVay has criticized Hirschfeld's theory of an early bisexual stage of development, calling it confusing; LeVay maintains that Hirschfeld failed to distinguish between saying that the brain is sexually undifferentiated at an early stage of development and saying that an individual actually experiences sexual attraction to both men and women. According to LeVay, Hirschfeld believed that in most bisexual people the strength of attraction to the same sex was relatively low, and that it was therefore possible to restrain its development in young people, something Hirschfeld supported.

Hirschfeld created a ten-point scale to measure the strength of sexual desire, with the direction of desire being represented by the letters A (for heterosexuality), B (for homosexuality), and A + B (for bisexuality). On this scale, someone who was A3, B9 would be weakly attracted to the opposite sex and very strongly attracted to the same sex, an A0, B0 would be asexual, and an A10, B10 would be very attracted to both sexes. LeVay compares Hirschfeld's scale to that developed by Kinsey decades later.

Sigmund Freud, the founder of psychoanalysis, believed that every human being is bisexual in the sense of incorporating general attributes of both sexes. In his view, this was true anatomically and therefore also psychologically, with sexual attraction to both sexes being an aspect of this psychological bisexuality. Freud believed that in the course of sexual development, the masculine side of this bisexual disposition would normally become dominant in men and the feminine side in women, but that all adults still have desires derived from both the masculine and the feminine sides of their natures. Freud did not claim that everyone is bisexual in the sense of feeling the same level of sexual attraction to men and women. Freud's belief in innate bisexuality was rejected by Sándor Radó in 1940 and, following Radó, by many later psychoanalysts. Radó argued that there is no biological bisexuality in humans.

Alan P. Bell, Martin S. Weinberg, and Sue Kiefer Hammersmith reported in Sexual Preference (1981) that sexual preference was much less strongly connected with pre-adult sexual feelings among bisexuals than it was among heterosexuals and homosexuals. Based on this and other findings, they suggested that bisexuality is more influenced by social and sexual learning than is exclusive homosexuality. Letitia Anne Peplau et al. wrote that while Bell et al.'s view "sounds plausible, it has not been tested explicitly and seems at odds with available evidence".

Human bisexuality has mainly been studied alongside homosexuality. Van Wyk and Geist argue that this is a problem for sexuality research because the few studies that have observed bisexuals separately have found that bisexuals are often different from both heterosexuals and homosexuals. Furthermore, bisexuality does not always represent a halfway point between the dichotomy. Research indicates that bisexuality is influenced by biological, cognitive and cultural variables in interaction, and this leads to different types of bisexuality.

In the current debate around influences on sexual orientation, biological explanations have been questioned by social scientists, particularly by feminists who encourage women to make conscious decisions about their lives and sexuality. A difference in attitude between homosexual men and women has also been reported, with men more likely to regard their sexuality as biological, "reflecting the universal male experience in this culture, not the complexities of the lesbian world." There is also evidence that women's sexuality may be more strongly affected by cultural and contextual factors.

American academic Camille Paglia has promoted bisexuality as an ideal. American Harvard professor Marjorie Garber made an academic case for bisexuality with her 1995 book Vice Versa: Bisexuality and the Eroticism of Everyday Life, in which she argued that most people would be bisexual if not for repression and other factors such as lack of sexual opportunity.

=== Brain structure and chromosomes ===
LeVay's (1991) examination at autopsy of 18 homosexual men, 1 bisexual man, 16 presumably heterosexual men and 6 presumably heterosexual women found that the INAH 3 nucleus of the anterior hypothalamus of homosexual men was smaller than that of heterosexual men and closer in size to that of heterosexual women. Although grouped with homosexuals, the INAH 3 size of the one bisexual subject was similar to that of the heterosexual men.

Some evidence supports the concept of biological precursors of bisexual orientation in genetic males. According to John Money (1988), genetic males with an extra Y chromosome are more likely to be bisexual, paraphilic and impulsive.

=== Evolutionary theory ===
Some evolutionary psychologists have argued that same-sex attraction does not have adaptive value because it has no association with potential reproductive success. Instead, bisexuality can be due to normal variation in brain plasticity. More recently, it has been suggested that same-sex alliances may have helped males climb the social hierarchy, giving access to females and reproductive opportunities. Same-sex allies could have helped females to move to the safer and resource richer center of the group, which increased their chances of raising their offspring successfully. Likewise, Barron and Hare suggest that same-sex attraction is a spandrel of prosocial traits, which has been consistently selected among humans over time. These prosocial traits include social affiliation, communication, integration, and reduced reactive aggression among members of the same sex.

David Buss criticized the alliance hypothesis, stating that there is no evidence that most young men in most cultures use sexual behavior to establish alliances; instead, the norm is for same-sex alliances not to be accompanied by any sexual activity. Additionally, he states that there is no evidence that men who engage in bisexual behavior do better than other men at forming alliances or ascending in status. Barron and Hare state that there are ethnographic examples of same-sex activity being used to strengthen social bonds among males and females.

Brendan Zietsch of the Queensland Institute of Medical Research proposes the alternative theory that men exhibiting female traits become more attractive to females and are thus more likely to mate, provided the genes involved do not drive them to complete rejection of heterosexuality. Barron and Hare concur and argue that this is one of the reasons why bisexuality is more common than exclusive homosexuality among animal populations, including human populations. However, this is underreported due to enforced binary dichotomies in previous research and cultural factors.

Also, in a 2008 study, its authors stated that "There is considerable evidence that human sexual orientation is genetically influenced, so it is not known how homosexuality, which tends to lower reproductive success, is maintained in the population at a relatively high frequency." They hypothesized that "while genes predisposing to homosexuality reduce homosexuals' reproductive success, they may confer some advantage in heterosexuals who carry them" and their results suggested that "genes predisposing to homosexuality may confer a mating advantage in heterosexuals, which could help explain the evolution and maintenance of homosexuality in the population." Barron and Hare say that this finding is only shown in Western European societies, with said finding being weakly supported in "other populations or cultures".

=== Masculinization ===
Masculinization of women and hypermasculinization of men has been a central theme in sexual orientation research. There are several studies suggesting that bisexuals have a high degree of masculinization. LaTorre and Wendenberg (1983) found differing personality characteristics for bisexual, heterosexual and homosexual women. Bisexuals were found to have fewer personal insecurities than heterosexuals and homosexuals. This finding described bisexuals as self-assured and less likely to have mental instabilities. The confidence of a secure identity consistently translated to more masculinity than other subjects. This study did not explore societal norms, prejudices, or the feminization of homosexual males.

In a research comparison, published in the Journal of the Association for Research in Otolaryngology, women usually have a better hearing sensitivity than males, assumed by researchers as a genetic disposition connected to childbearing. Homosexual and bisexual women have been found to have a hypersensitivity to sound in comparison to heterosexual women, suggesting a genetic disposition not to tolerate high-pitched tones. While heterosexual, homosexual and bisexual men have been found to exhibit similar patterns of hearing, there was a notable differential in a sub-group of males identified as hyperfeminized homosexual males who exhibited test results similar to heterosexual women.

=== Prenatal hormones ===
The prenatal hormonal theory of sexual orientation suggests that people who are exposed to excess levels of sex hormones have masculinized brains and show increased homosexuality or bisexuality. Studies providing evidence for the masculinization of the brain have, however, not been conducted to date. Research on special conditions such as congenital adrenal hyperplasia (CAH) and exposure to diethylstilbestrol (DES) indicates that prenatal exposure to, respectively, excess testosterone and estrogen is associated with female–female sex fantasies in adults. Both effects are associated with bisexuality rather than homosexuality.

There is research evidence that the digit ratio of the length of the 2nd and 4th digits (index finger and ring finger) is somewhat negatively related to prenatal testosterone and positively to estrogen. Studies measuring the fingers found a statistically significant skew in the 2D:4D ratio (long ring finger) towards homosexuality, with an even lower ratio in bisexuals. It is suggested that exposure to high prenatal testosterone and low prenatal estrogen concentrations is one cause of homosexuality. In contrast, exposure to very high testosterone levels may be associated with bisexuality. Because testosterone in general is important for sexual differentiation, this view offers an alternative to the suggestion that male homosexuality is genetic.

The prenatal hormonal theory suggests that a homosexual orientation results from exposure to excessive testosterone, causing an over-masculinized brain. This is contradictory to another hypothesis that homosexual preferences may be due to a feminized brain in males. However, it has also been suggested that homosexuality may be due to high prenatal levels of unbound testosterone that result from a lack of receptors at particular brain sites. Therefore, the brain could be feminized while other features, such as the 2D:4D ratio, could be over-masculinized.

=== Sex drive ===
Van Wyk and Geist summarized several studies comparing bisexuals with hetero- or homosexuals that have indicated that bisexuals have higher rates of sexual activity, fantasy, or erotic interest. These studies found that male and female bisexuals had more heterosexual fantasy than heterosexuals or homosexuals; that bisexual men had more sexual activities with women than did heterosexual men, and that they masturbated more but had fewer happy marriages than heterosexuals; that bisexual women had more orgasms per week and they described them as stronger than those of hetero- or homosexual women; and that bisexual women became heterosexually active earlier, masturbated and enjoyed masturbation more, and were more experienced in different types of heterosexual contact.

Research suggests that, for most women, a high sex drive is associated with increased sexual attraction to both women and men. For men, however, a high sex drive is associated with increased attraction to one sex or the other, but not to both, depending on sexual orientation. Similarly for most bisexual women, high sex drive is associated with increased sexual attraction to both women and men; while for bisexual men, high sex drive is associated with increased attraction to one sex, and weakened attraction to the other.

=== Sociosexuality ===
Richard A. Lippa proposed that there exist two dimensions of sexual orientation: a gender typicality dimension, and a monosexuality dimension. The gender typicality dimension is associated with the heterosexual-homosexual distinction, while the sociosexuality dimension has many behavioral effects. He proposes that someone who would be at any point in the heterosexual-homosexual spectrum will become bisexual if they are high on the sociosexuality dimension. This dimension being associated with higher sociosexuality, higher neuroticism, lower agreeableness, lower honesty-humility, higher openness to experience, and a minor degree of gender nonconformity. He proposes this as explaining phenomena such as increased juvenile delinquency among bisexuals, increased mental health issues and substance use disorder among bisexuals, and increased dark triad traits among bisexual women. Critics of this theory have described elements observed as coming from experiences of biphobia, but Lippa counters that these phenomena are present even among heterosexual identifying people with some same sex attraction, who would likely be heterosexual passing.

== Community ==
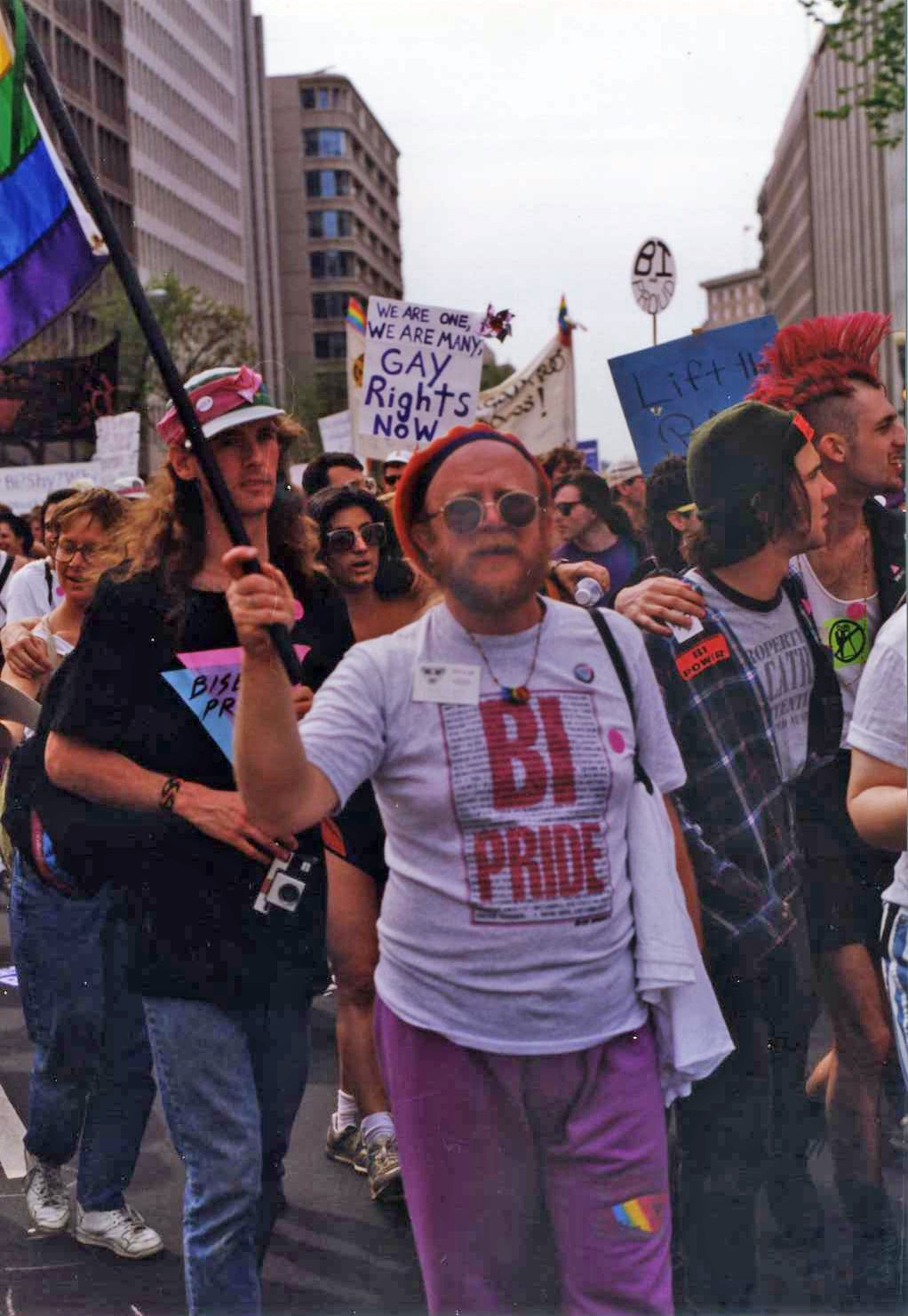
Participants representing Bi Pride in the 1993 March on Washington

=== General social impacts ===
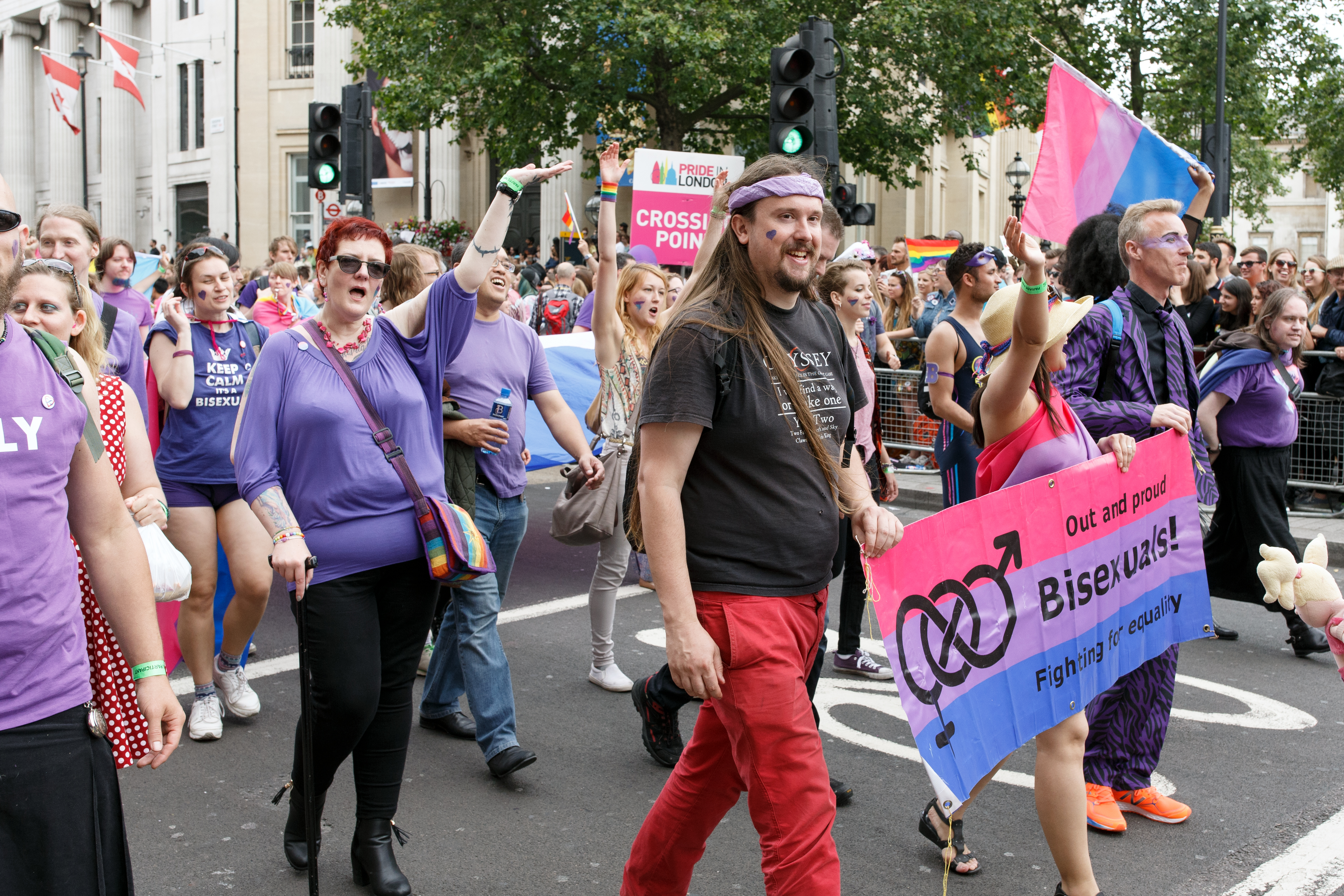
Bisexual people representing Bi Pride in London 2016

The bisexual community (also known as the bisexual/pansexual, bi/pan/fluid, or non-monosexual community) includes members of the LGBTQ community who identify as bisexual, pansexual or fluid. Because some bisexual people do not feel that they fit into either the gay or the heterosexual world, and because they have a tendency to be "invisible" in public, some bisexual persons are committed to forming their own communities, culture, and political movements. Some who identify as bisexual may merge themselves into either homosexual or heterosexual society. Other bisexual people see this merging as enforced rather than voluntary; bisexual people can face exclusion from both homosexual and heterosexual society on coming out. Psychologist Beth Firestein states that bisexuals tend to internalize social tensions related to their choice of partners and feel pressured to label themselves as homosexuals instead of occupying the difficult middle ground where attraction to people of both sexes would defy society's value on monogamy. These social tensions and pressure may affect bisexuals' mental health, and specific therapy methods have been developed for bisexuals to address this concern.

Bisexual people also often hide their actual orientation due to societal pressures, a phenomenon colloquially called "being closeted". In the U.S., a 2013 Pew survey showed that 28% of bisexuals said that "all or most of the important people in their life are aware that they are LGBT" compared to 77% of gay men and 71% of lesbians. Furthermore, when broken down by gender, only 12% of bisexual men said that they were "out" vs. 33% of bisexual women.

=== Perceptions and discrimination ===
Like people of other LGBTQ sexualities, bisexuals often face discrimination. In addition to the discrimination associated with homophobia, bisexuals frequently contend with discrimination from gay men, lesbians, and straight society around the word bisexual and bisexual identity itself. The belief that everyone is bisexual (especially women as opposed to men), or that bisexuality does not exist as a unique identity, is common. This stems from two views: In the heterosexist view, people are presumed to be sexually attracted to the opposite sex, and it is sometimes reasoned that a bisexual person is simply a heterosexual person who is sexually experimenting. In the monosexist view, it is believed that people cannot be bisexual unless they are equally sexually attracted to both sexes, regulating sexual orientation to being about the sex or gender one prefers. In this view, people are either exclusively homosexual (gay/lesbian) or exclusively heterosexual (straight), closeted homosexual people who wish to appear heterosexual, or heterosexuals who are experimenting with their sexuality. Assertions that one cannot be bisexual unless equally sexually attracted to both sexes, however, are disputed by various researchers, who have reported bisexuality to fall on a continuum, like sexuality in general.

Male bisexuality is particularly presumed to be non-existent, with sexual fluidity studies adding to the debate. In 2005, researchers Gerulf Rieger, Meredith L. Chivers, and J. Michael Bailey used penile plethysmography to measure the arousal of self-identified bisexual men to pornography involving only men and pornography involving only women. Participants were recruited via advertisements in gay-oriented magazines and an alternative paper. They found that the self-identified bisexual men in their sample had genital arousal patterns similar to either homosexual or heterosexual men. The authors concluded that "in terms of behavior and identity, bisexual men clearly exist", but that male bisexuality had not been shown to exist with respect to arousal or attraction. Some researchers hold that the technique used in the study to measure genital arousal is too crude to capture the richness (erotic sensations, affection, admiration) that constitutes sexual attraction. The National Gay and Lesbian Task Force called the study and The New York Times coverage of it flawed and biphobic.

The American Institute of Bisexuality stated that Bailey's study was misinterpreted and misreported by both The New York Times and its critics. In 2011, Bailey and other researchers reported that among men with a history of several romantic and sexual relationships with members of both sexes, high levels of sexual arousal were found in response to both male and female sexual imagery. The subjects were recruited from a Craigslist group for men seeking intimacy with both members of a heterosexual couple. The authors said that this change in recruitment strategy was an important difference, but it may not have been a representative sample of bisexual-identified men. They concluded that "bisexual-identified men with bisexual arousal patterns do indeed exist", but could not establish whether such a pattern is typical of bisexual-identified men in general.

Bisexual erasure (or bisexual invisibility) is the tendency to ignore, remove, falsify, or reexplain evidence of bisexuality in culture, history, academia, news media and other primary sources. In its most extreme form, bisexual erasure includes denying that bisexuality exists. It is often a manifestation of biphobia, although it does not necessarily involve overt antagonism.

There is increasing inclusion and visibility of bisexuals, particularly in the LGBTQ community. American psychologist Beth Firestone writes that since she wrote her first book on bisexuality, in 1996, "bisexuality has gained visibility, although progress is uneven and awareness of bisexuality is still minimal or absent in many of the more remote regions of our country and internationally."

=== Symbols and observances ===
The bisexual pride flag

The biangles symbol of bisexuality, designed by artist Liz Nania

The double crescent moon bisexuality symbol, designed by Vivian Wagner

A common symbol of the bisexual community is the bisexual flag, designed by Michael Page and unveiled in 1998, which has a deep pink stripe at the top for homosexuality, a blue one on the bottom for heterosexuality, and a purple one – blending the pink and blue – in the middle to represent bisexuality.

Another symbol with a similarly symbolic color scheme is the biangles symbol of bisexuality, a pair of overlapping pink and blue triangles, forming lavender where they intersect. This design is an expansion on the pink triangle, a well-known symbol for the gay community. The biangles symbol was designed by artist Liz Nania as she co-organized a bisexual contingent for the Second National March on Washington for Lesbian and Gay Rights in 1987. However, some bisexual individuals object to the use of a pink triangle, as it was a symbol used in Nazi Germany to tag and persecute homosexuals. In response, a double crescent moon symbol was devised by Vivian Wagner in 1998. This symbol is common in Germany and surrounding countries.

Venus flanked by Venus and Mars symbols for a bisexual person

Venus flanked by Venus and Mars symbols for a bisexual woman

Mars flanked by Venus and Mars symbols for a bisexual man

Celebrate Bisexuality Day (also called Bisexual Pride Day, Bi Visibility Day, CBD, Bisexual Pride and Bi Visibility Day, and Bisexuality+ Day) is observed annually on September 23 to recognize and celebrate bisexual people, the bisexual community, and the history of bisexuality.

=== In BDSM ===
In Steve Lenius' original 2001 paper, he explored the acceptance of bisexuality in a supposedly pansexual BDSM community. The reasoning behind this is that "coming-out" had become primarily the territory of the gay and lesbian, with bisexuals feeling the push to be one or the other (and being right only half the time either way). What he found in 2001, was that people in BDSM were open to discussion about the topic of bisexuality and pansexuality and all controversies they bring to the table, but personal biases and issues stood in the way of actively using such labels. A decade later, Lenius (2011) looked back on his study and considered if anything has changed. He concluded that the standing of bisexuals in the BDSM and kink community was unchanged, and believed that positive shifts in attitude were moderated by society's changing views towards different sexualities and orientations. But Lenius (2011) does emphasize that the pansexual promoting BDSM community helped advance greater acceptance of alternative sexualities.

Brandy Lin Simula (2012), on the other hand, argues that BDSM actively resists gender conforming and identified three different types of BDSM bisexuality: gender-switching, gender-based styles (taking on a different gendered style depending on gender of partner when playing), and rejection of gender (resisting the idea that gender matters in their play partners). Simula (2012) explains that practitioners of BDSM routinely challenge our concepts of sexuality by pushing the limits on pre-existing ideas of sexual orientation and gender norms. For some, BDSM and kink provides a platform in creating identities that are fluid, ever-changing.

=== In feminism ===
Feminist positions on bisexuality range greatly, from acceptance of bisexuality as a feminist issue to rejection of bisexuality as reactionary and anti-feminist backlash to lesbian feminism. A number of women who were at one time involved in lesbian-feminist activism have since come out as bisexual after realizing their attractions to men. A widely studied example of lesbian-bisexual conflict in feminism was the Northampton Pride March in Massachusetts during the years between 1989 and 1993, where many feminists involved debated over whether bisexuals should be included and whether or not bisexuality was compatible with feminism.

Common lesbian-feminist critiques leveled at bisexuality were that bisexuality was anti-feminist, that bisexuality was a form of false consciousness, and that bisexual women who pursue relationships with men were "deluded and desperate." Tensions between bisexual feminists and lesbian feminists have eased since the 1990s, as bisexual women have become more accepted in the feminist community, but some lesbian feminists such as Julie Bindel are still critical of bisexuality. Bindel has described female bisexuality as a "fashionable trend" being promoted due to "sexual hedonism" and broached the question of whether bisexuality even exists. She has also made tongue-in-cheek comparisons of bisexuals to cat fanciers and devil worshippers. Sheila Jeffreys writes in The Lesbian Heresy that while many feminists are comfortable working alongside gay men, they are uncomfortable interacting with bisexual men. Jeffreys states that while gay men are unlikely to sexually harass women, bisexual men are just as likely to be bothersome to women as heterosexual men.

Donna Haraway was the inspiration and genesis for cyberfeminism with her 1985 essay "A Cyborg Manifesto: Science, Technology, and Socialist-Feminism in the Late Twentieth Century" which was reprinted in Simians, Cyborgs and Women: The Reinvention of Nature (1991). Haraway's essay states that the cyborg "has no truck with bisexuality, pre-oedipal symbiosis, unalienated labor, or other seductions to organic wholeness through a final appropriation of all powers of the parts into a higher unity."

A bisexual woman filed a lawsuit against the magazine Common Lives/Lesbian Lives, alleging discrimination against bisexuals when her submission was not published.

== History ==
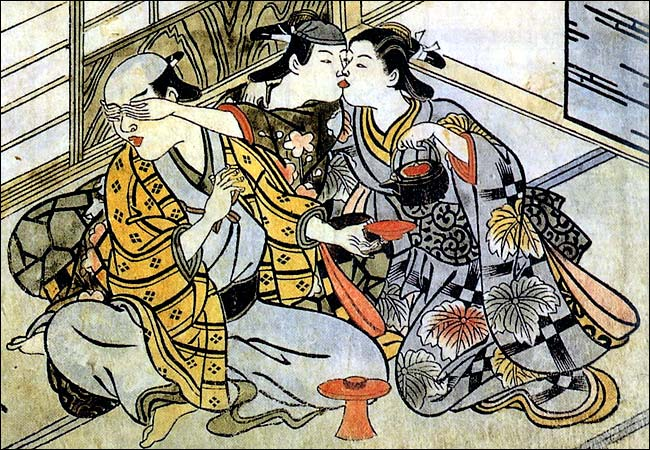
Shudo (Japanese pederasty): a young male entertains an older male lover, covering his eyes while surreptitiously kissing a female servant.

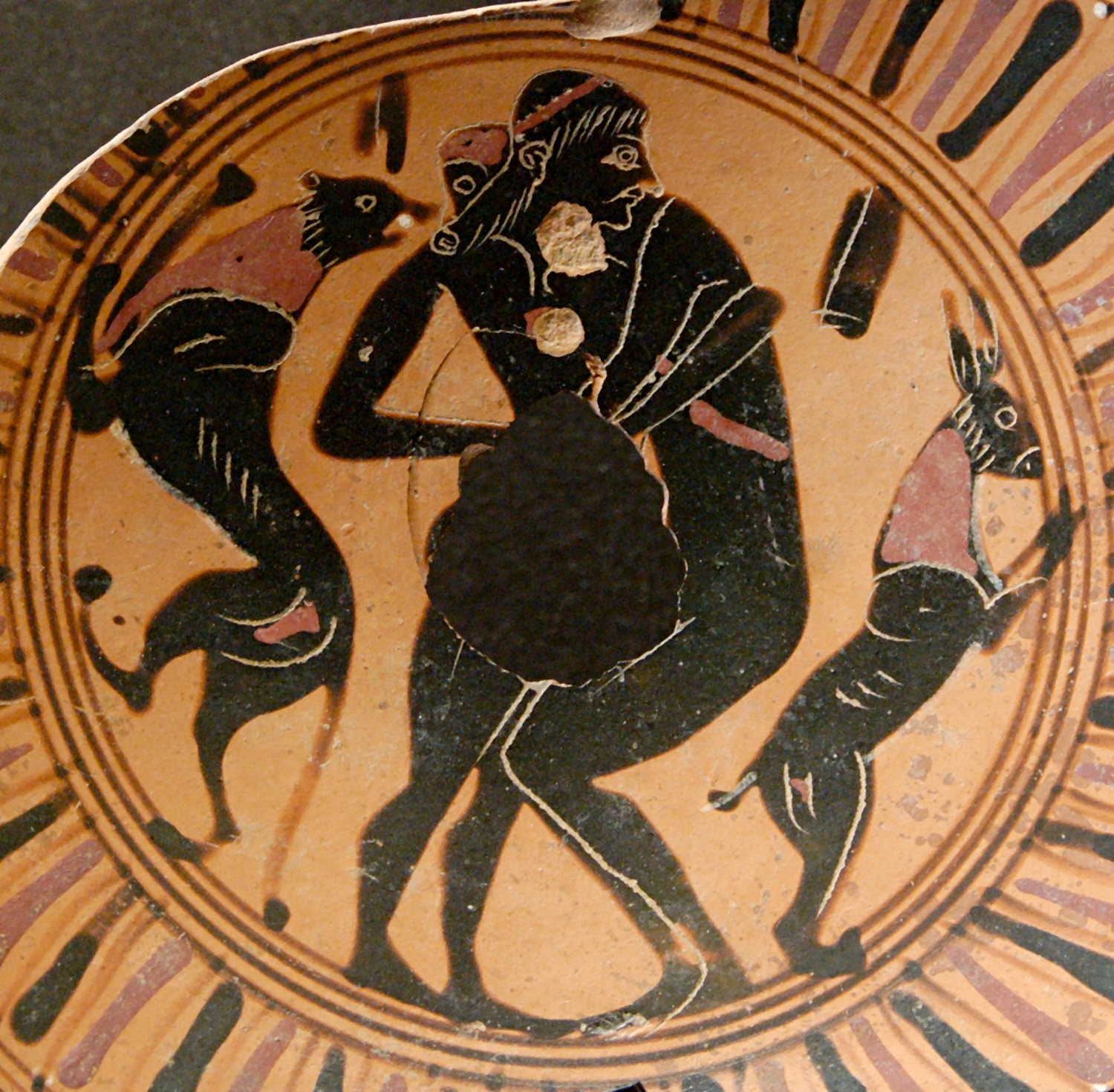
Young man and adolescent engaging in intercrural sex, fragment of a black-figure Attic cup, 550 BC–525 BC, Louvre

Ancient Greeks and Romans did not associate sexual relations with well-defined labels, as modern Western society does. Men who had male lovers were not identified as homosexual, and may have had wives or other female lovers.

Ancient Greek religious texts, reflecting cultural practices, incorporated bisexual themes. The subtexts varied, from the mystical to the didactic. Spartans thought that love and erotic relationships between experienced and novice soldiers would solidify combat loyalty and unit cohesion, and encourage heroic tactics as men vied to impress their lovers. Once the younger soldiers reached maturity, the relationship was supposed to become non-sexual, but it is not clear how strictly this was followed. There was some stigma attached to young men who continued their relationships with their mentors into adulthood. For example, Aristophanes calls them euryprôktoi, meaning 'wide arses', and depicts them like women.

In early modern times, John Hoyle was an Englishman known for his bisexuality. Alfred Kinsey conducted the first large surveys of homosexual behavior in the United States during the 1940s. The results shocked the readers of his day because they made same-sex behavior and attractions seem so common. His 1948 work Sexual Behavior in the Human Male stated that among men "nearly half (46%) of the population engages in both heterosexual and homosexual activities, or reacts to persons of both sexes, in the course of their adult lives" and that "37% of the total male population has at least some overt homosexual experience to the point of orgasm since the onset of adolescence." Kinsey himself disliked the use of the term bisexual to describe individuals who engage in sexual activity with both males and females, preferring to use bisexual in its original, biological sense as hermaphroditic, stating, "Until it is demonstrated [that] taste in a sexual relation is dependent upon the individual containing within his anatomy both male and female structures, or male and female physiological capacities, it is unfortunate to call such individuals bisexual." Although more recent researchers believe that Kinsey overestimated the rate of same-sex attraction, his work is considered pioneering and some of the most well known sex research of all time.

== Media ==
Bisexuality tends to be associated with negative media portrayals; references are sometimes made to stereotypes or mental disorders. In an article regarding the 2005 film Brokeback Mountain, sex educator Amy Andre argued that in films, bisexuals are often depicted negatively:

I like movies where bisexuals come out to each other together and fall in love, because these tend to be so few and far between; the most recent example would be 2002's lovely romantic comedy, Kissing Jessica Stein. Most movies with bi characters paint a stereotypical picture.... The bi love interest is usually deceptive (Mulholland Drive), over-sexed (Sex Monster), unfaithful (High Art), and fickle (Three of Hearts), and might even be a serial killer, like Sharon Stone in Basic Instinct. In other words, the bisexual is always the cause of the conflict in the film.

— Amy Andre, American Sexuality Magazine

Using a content analysis of more than 170 articles written between 2001 and 2006, sociologist Richard N. Pitt Jr. concluded that the media pathologized black bisexual men's behavior while either ignoring or sympathizing with white bisexual men's similar actions. He argued that the black bisexual man is often described as a duplicitous heterosexual man spreading the HIV/AIDS virus. Alternatively, the white bisexual man is often described in pitying language as a victimized homosexual man forced into the closet by the heterosexist society around him.

=== Film ===
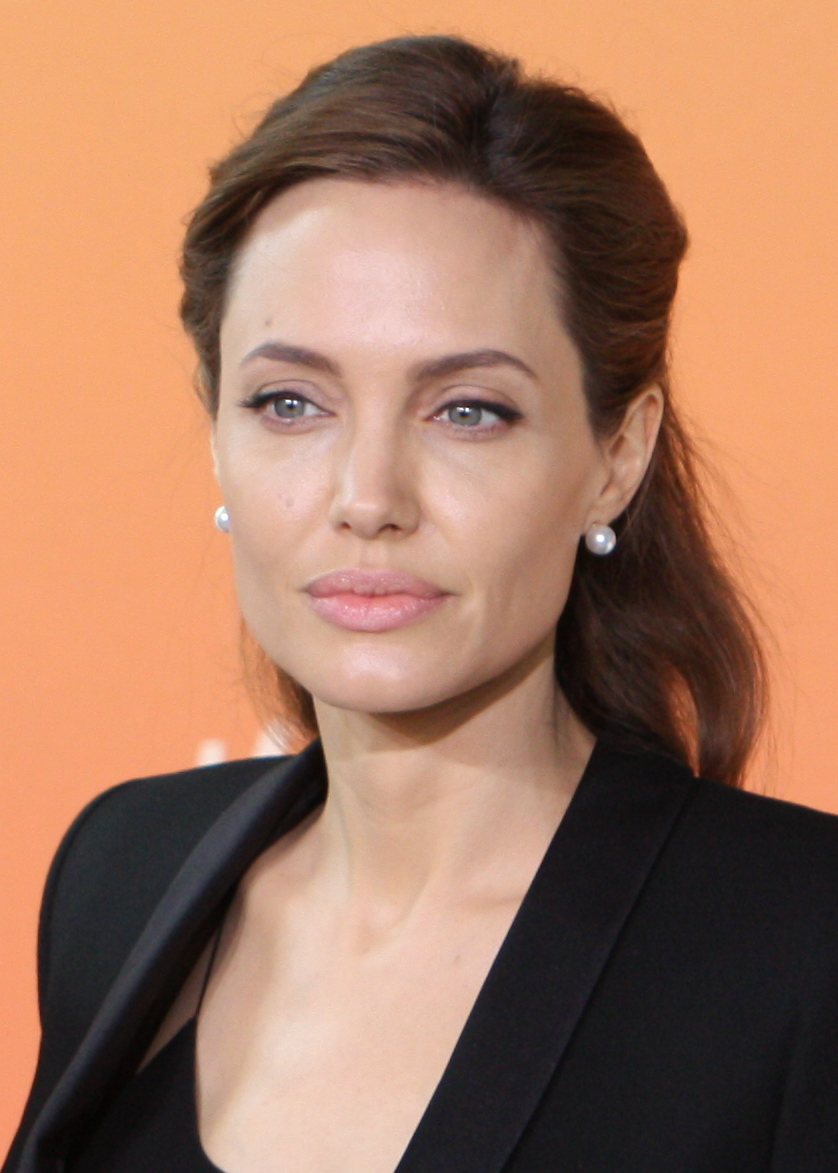
Angelina Jolie is an openly bisexual American actress.

In 1914 the first documented appearance of bisexual characters (female and male) in an American motion picture occurred in A Florida Enchantment, by Sidney Drew. However, under the censorship required by the Hays Code, the word bisexual could not be mentioned, and almost no bisexual characters appeared in American film from 1934 until 1968.

Notable and varying portrayals of bisexuality can be found in mainstream movies such as Something for Everyone (1970), Sunday Bloody Sunday (1971), The Rocky Horror Picture Show (1975), The Fourth Man (1983), Henry & June (1990), Basic Instinct (1992), Showgirls (1995), The Pillow Book (1996), Chasing Amy (1997), Velvet Goldmine (1998), Kissing Jessica Stein (2001), Mulholland Drive (2001), Frida (2002), The Rules of Attraction (2002), Alexander (2004), Brokeback Mountain (2005), Black Swan (2010), and Call Me by Your Name (2017).

=== Literature ===
Virginia Woolf's Orlando: A Biography (1928) is an early example of bisexuality in literature. The story, of a man who changes into a woman without a second thought, was based on the life of Woolf's lover Vita Sackville-West. Woolf used the gender switch to avoid the book being banned for homosexual content. The pronouns switch from male to female as Orlando's gender changes. Woolf's lack of definite pronouns allows for ambiguity and lack of emphasis on gender labels. Her 1925 book Mrs Dalloway focused on a bisexual man and a bisexual woman in sexually unfulfilled heterosexual marriages in later life. Following Sackille-West's death, her son Nigel Nicolson published Portrait of a Marriage, one of her diaries recounting her affair with a woman during her marriage to Harold Nicolson. Other early examples include works of D. H. Lawrence, such as Women in Love (1920), and Colette's Claudine (1900–1903) series.

The main character in Patrick White's novel, The Twyborn Affair (1979), is bisexual. Contemporary novelist Bret Easton Ellis' novels, such as Less than Zero (1985) and The Rules of Attraction (1987) frequently feature bisexual male characters; this "casual approach" to bisexual characters recurs throughout Ellis' work.

=== Music ===
Rock musician David Bowie famously declared himself bisexual in an interview with Melody Maker in January 1972, a move coinciding with the first shots in his campaign for stardom as Ziggy Stardust. In a September 1976 interview with Playboy, Bowie said, "It's true—I am a bisexual. But I can't deny that I've used that fact very well. I suppose it's the best thing that ever happened to me." In a 1983 interview, he said it was "the biggest mistake I ever made", elaborating in 2002 he explained "I don't think it was a mistake in Europe, but it was a lot tougher in America. I had no problem with people knowing I was bisexual. But I had no inclination to hold any banners or be a representative of any group of people. I knew what I wanted to be, which was a songwriter and a performer [...] America is a very puritanical place, and I think it stood in the way of so much I wanted to do."

Queen singer Freddie Mercury was also open about his bisexuality, though he did not publicly discuss his relationships.

In 1995, Jill Sobule sang about bi-curiosity in her song "I Kissed a Girl", with a video that alternated images of Sobule and a boyfriend along with images of her with a girlfriend. Another song with the same name by Katy Perry also hints at the same theme. Some activists, researchers, and general listeners suggest Perry's song merely reinforces the stereotype of bisexuals experimenting and of bisexuality not being a real sexual preference. Lady Gaga has also stated that she is bisexual, and has acknowledged that her song "Poker Face" is about fantasizing about a woman while being with a man.

Brian Molko, lead singer of Placebo, is openly bisexual. Green Day frontman Billie Joe Armstrong has also discussed his bisexual identity, saying in a 1995 interview with The Advocate, "I think I've always been bisexual. I mean, it's something that I've always been interested in. I think people are born bisexual, and it's just that our parents and society kind of veer us off into this feeling of 'Oh, I can't.' They say it's taboo. It's ingrained in our heads that it's bad, when it's not bad at all. It's a very beautiful thing." In 2014, Armstrong discussed songs such as "Coming Clean" stating, "It was a song about questioning myself. There are these other feelings you may have about the same sex, the opposite sex, especially being in Berkeley and San Francisco then. People are acting out what they're feeling: gay, bisexual, transgender, whatever. And that opens up something in society that becomes more acceptable. Now we have gay marriage becoming recognized... I think it's a process of discovery. I was willing to try anything."

R&B artist Frank Ocean came out as bisexual in a Tumblr post in 2012; in the post, Ocean described his feelings towards a man he had spent his summer with four years prior.

=== Television ===
In the Netflix original series Orange is the New Black, the main character, Piper Chapman, played by actress Taylor Schilling, is a bisexual female inmate who is shown having relationships with both men and women. In season one, before entering the prison, Piper is engaged to male fiancé Larry Bloom, played by actor Jason Biggs. Then, upon entering the prison, she reconnects with former lover (and fellow inmate), Alex Vause, played by Laura Prepon. Another character who is portrayed as bisexual in the show is an inmate named Lorna Morello, played by actress Yael Stone. She has an intimate relationship with fellow inmate Nicky Nichols, played by Natasha Lyonne, while still yearning for her male "fiance", Christopher MacLaren, played by Stephen O'Reilly.

The FOX television series House features a bisexual female doctor, Remy "Thirteen" Hadley, played by Olivia Wilde, from season four onwards. The same network had earlier aired the television series The O.C., which for a time featured bisexual Alex Kelly (also played by Olivia Wilde), the local rebellious hangout spot's manager, as a love interest of Marissa Cooper. In the HBO drama Oz, Chris Keller was a bisexual serial killer who tortured and raped various men and women.

Beginning with the 2009 season, MTV's The Real World series featured two bisexual characters, Emily Schromm, and Mike Manning.

The Showcase supernatural crime drama, Lost Girl, about creatures called Fae who live secretly among humans, features a bisexual protagonist, Bo, played by Anna Silk. In the story arc she is involved in a love triangle between Dyson, a wolf-shapeshifter (played by Kris Holden-Ried), and Lauren Lewis, a human doctor (played by Zoie Palmer) in servitude to the leader of the Light Fae clan.

In the BBC TV science fiction show Torchwood, several of the main characters appear to have fluid sexuality. Most prominent among these is Captain Jack Harkness, a pansexual person who is the lead character and an otherwise conventional science fiction action hero. Within the logic of the show, where characters can also interact with alien species, producers sometimes use the term "omnisexual" to describe him. Jack's ex, Captain John Hart, is also bisexual. Of his female exes, significantly at least one ex-wife and at least one woman with whom he has had a child have been indicated. Some critics draw the conclusion that the series more often shows Jack with men than women. Creator Russell T Davies says one of pitfalls of writing a bisexual character is you "fall into the trap" of "only having them sleep with men." He describes of the show's fourth series, "You'll see the full range of his appetites, in a really properly done way." The preoccupation with bisexuality has been seen by critics as complementary to other aspects of the show's themes. For heterosexual character Gwen Cooper, for whom Jack harbors romantic feelings, the new experiences she confronts at Torchwood, in the form of "affairs and homosexuality and the threat of death", connote not only the Other but a "missing side" to the Self. Under the influence of an alien pheromone, Gwen kisses a woman in Episode 2 of the series. In Episode 1, heterosexual Owen Harper kisses a man to escape a fight when he is about to take the man's girlfriend. Quiet Toshiko Sato is in love with Owen, but has also had brief romantic relationships with a female alien and a male human.

=== Webseries ===
In October 2009, "A Rose By Any Other Name" was released as a "webisode" series on YouTube. Directed by bisexual rights advocate Kyle Schickner, the plot centers around a lesbian-identified woman who falls in love with a straight man and discovers she is actually bisexual.

== Among other animals ==
Some non-human animal species exhibit bisexual behavior. Examples of mammals that display such behavior include the bonobo, orca, walrus, and the bottlenose dolphin. Examples of birds include some species of gulls and Humboldt penguins. Other examples of bisexual behavior occur among fish and flatworms.

== See also ==
- Bicurious
- Biphobia
- Bisexual chic
- Bisexual erasure
- Bisexual literature
- Bisexual theory
- Journal of Bisexuality
- List of bisexual characters in literature
- List of gay, lesbian or bisexual people
- List of LGBTQ-related organizations
- List of media portrayals of bisexuality
- List of bisexual people
- Situational sexual behavior
- Victimization of bisexual women
