= Zoophilia =

Sexual fixation on non-human animals

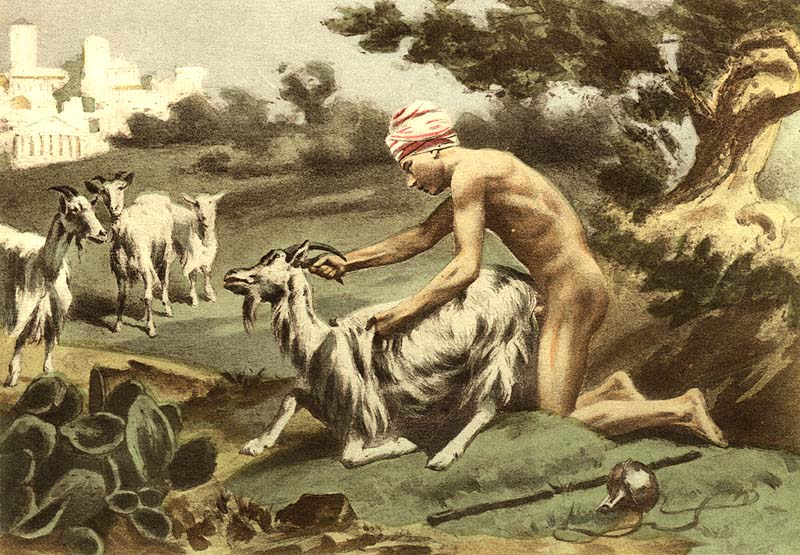
"Ancient Greek sodomising a goat", plate XVII from De Figuris Veneris by F. K. Forberg, illustrated by Édouard-Henri Avril

Zoophilia is a paraphilia in which a person experiences a sexual fixation on non-human animals. While the term bestiality is often used interchangeably, it differs in that it describes sexual acts with animals independently from attraction.

Zoophilia was estimated to occur in 2% of the population in 2021.

== Terminology ==
=== Etymology ===
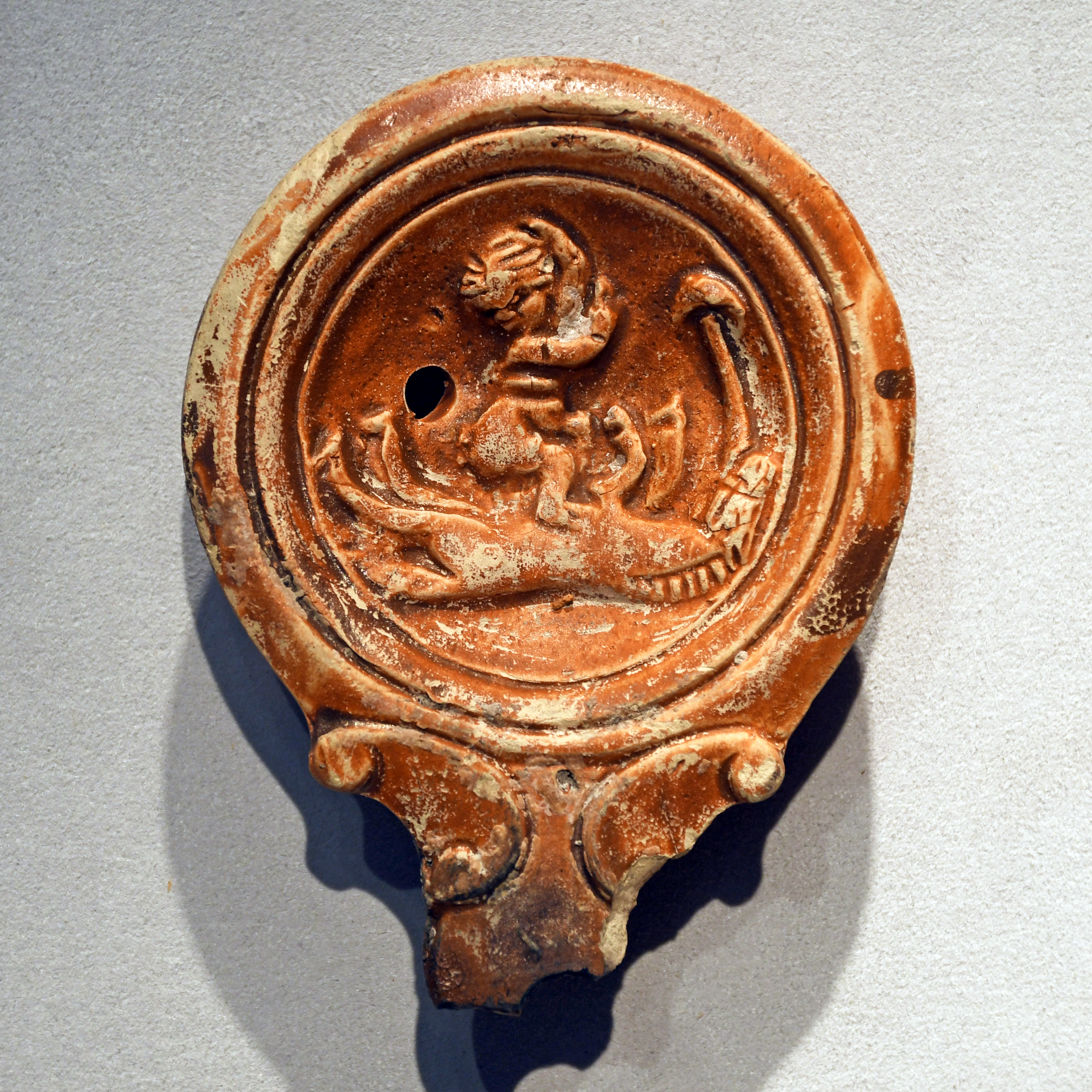
Roman oil lamp dating from 1st–3rd century AD depicting a zoophilic act

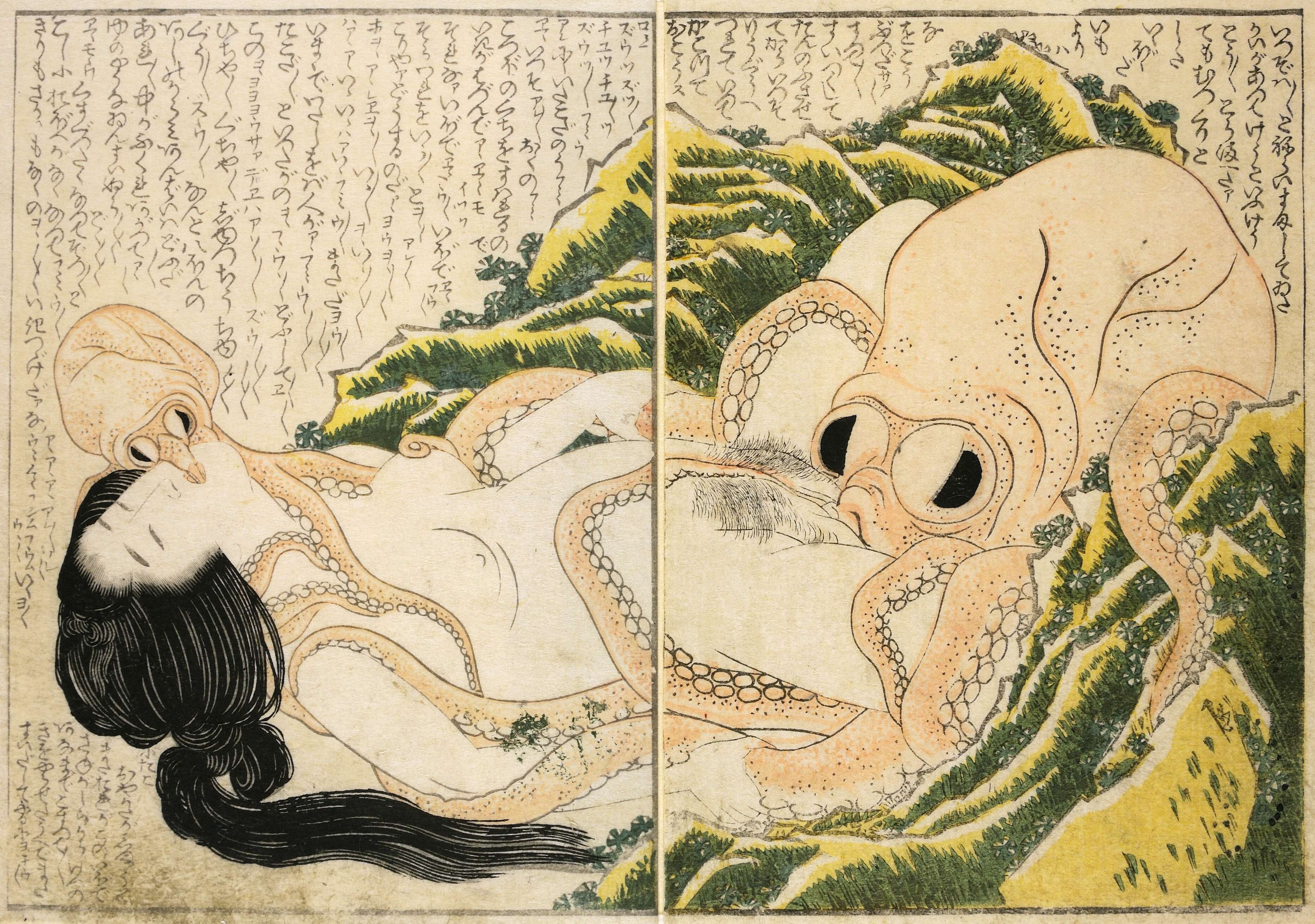
Hokusai's (1760–1849) The Dream of the Fisherman's Wife

The term zoophilia was introduced into the field of research on sexuality in Psychopathia Sexualis (1886) by Krafft-Ebing, who described a number of cases of "violation of animals (bestiality)", as well as "zoophilia erotica", which he defined as a sexual attraction to animal skin or fur. The term zoophilia derives from the combination of two nouns in Greek: ζῷον (zṓon, meaning "animal"), and φιλία (philia, meaning "(fraternal) love"). In general contemporary usage, the term zoophilia may refer to sexual activity between human and non-human animals, the desire to engage in such, or to the specific paraphilia (i.e. the atypical arousal) that indicates a definite preference for animals over humans as sexual partners. Krafft-Ebing also coined the term zooerasty for the paraphilia of exclusive sexual attraction to animals.

=== Bestiality ===
While the two words are often used interchangeably, a distinction is generally made between zoophilia (as a persistent sexual interest in animals) and bestiality (as sexual acts with animals).

This is because bestiality is often not driven by a sexual preference for animals. Some studies have found a preference for animals is rare among people who engage in sexual contact with animals. Furthermore, some zoophiles report they have never had sexual contact with an animal. People with zoophilia are known as "zoophiles", though also sometimes as "zoosexuals", or even very simply "zoos".

Stephanie LaFarge, an assistant professor of psychiatry at the New Jersey Medical School, and Director of Counseling at the ASPCA, writes that two groups can be distinguished: bestialists, who rape or abuse animals, and zoophiles, who form an emotional and sexual attachment to animals. Colin J. Williams and Martin Weinberg studied self-defined zoophiles via the internet and reported them as understanding the term zoophilia to involve concern for the animal's welfare, pleasure, and consent, as distinct from the self-labelled zoophiles' concept of "bestialists", whom the zoophiles in their study defined as focused on their own gratification. Williams & Weinberg (2003) also quoted a British newspaper saying that zoophilia is a term used by "apologists" for bestiality.

=== Other terms ===
The term zoosexual was proposed by Hani Miletski in 2002 as a value-neutral term. Usage of zoosexual as a noun (in reference to a person) is synonymous with zoophile, while the adjectival form of the word – as, for instance, in the phrase "zoosexual act" – may indicate sexual activity between a human and an animal. The derivative noun "zoosexuality" is sometimes used by self-identified zoophiles in both support groups and on internet-based discussion forums to designate sexual orientation manifesting as sexual attraction to animals.

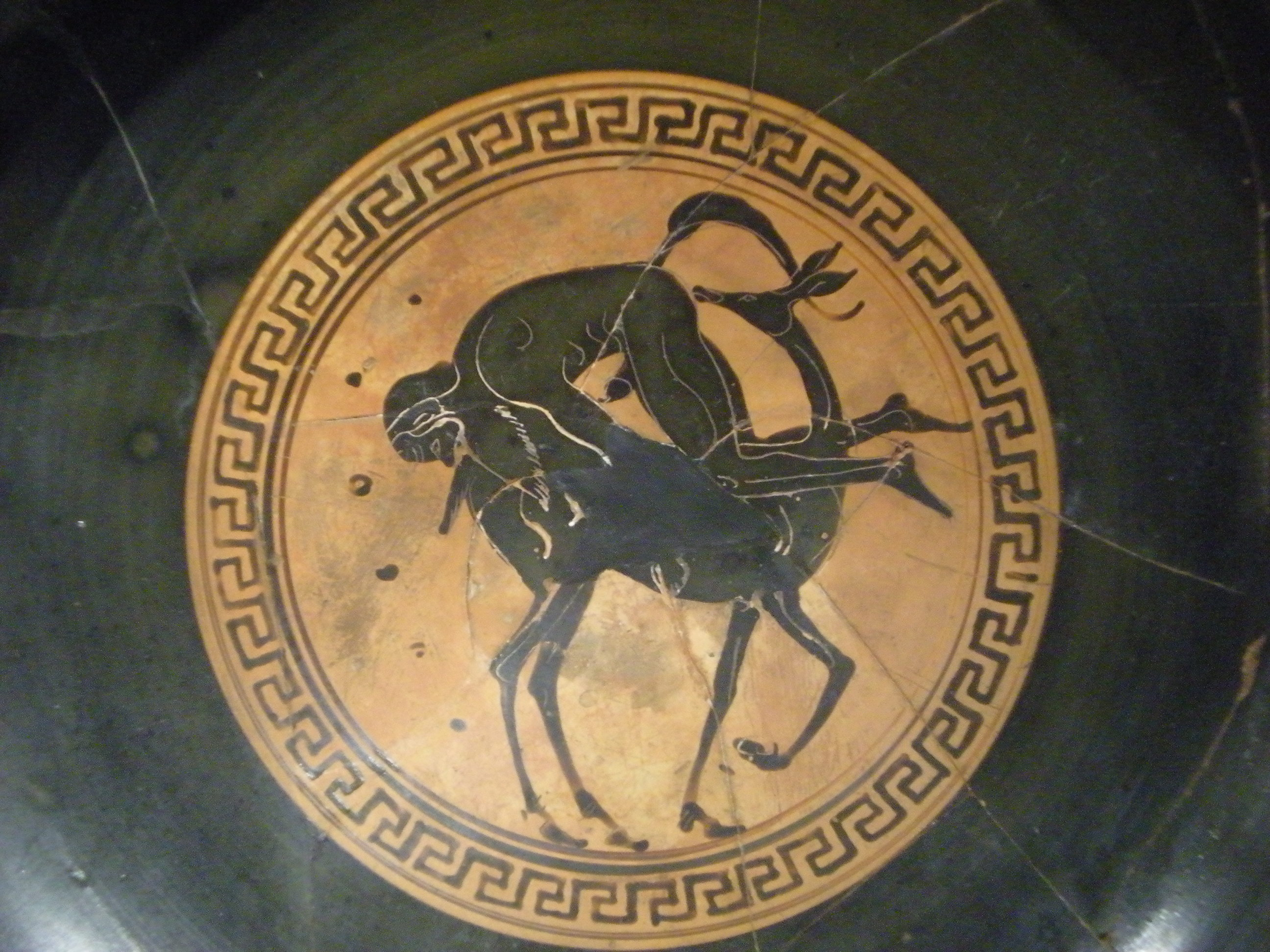
A kylix depicting Silenus having sex with a fawn, dated after 500 BC.

Ernest Bornemann coined the separate term zoosadism for those who derive pleasure – sexual or otherwise – from inflicting pain on animals. Zoosadism specifically is one member of the Macdonald triad of precursors to sociopathic behavior.

Sexual arousal from watching animals mate is known as faunoiphilia.

== Research ==
Zoophilia has been discussed by several sciences: psychology (the study of the human mind), sexology (a relatively new discipline primarily studying human sexuality), ethology (the study of animal behavior), and anthrozoology (the study of human–animal interactions and bonds).

In the fifth edition of the Diagnostic and Statistical Manual of Mental Disorders (DSM-5), zoophilia is placed in the classification "other specified paraphilic disorder" ("paraphilias not otherwise specified" in the DSM-III and IV). The World Health Organization takes the same position, listing a sexual preference for animals in its ICD-10 as "other disorder of sexual preference". In the DSM-5, it rises to the level of a diagnosable disorder only when accompanied by distress or interference with normal functioning.

Zoophilia may be covered to some degree by other fields, such as ethics, philosophy, law, animal rights and animal welfare. It may also be touched upon by sociology, which looks both at zoosadism in examining patterns and issues related to sexual abuse and at non-sexual zoophilia in examining the role of animals as emotional support and companionship in human lives, and may fall within the scope of psychiatry if it becomes necessary to consider its significance in a clinical context. The Journal of Forensic and Legal Medicine (Vol. 18, February 2011) states that sexual contact with animals is almost never a clinically significant problem by itself; it also states that there are several kinds of zoophiles:

- Human-animal role-players
- Romantic zoophiles
- Zoophilic fantasizers
- Tactile zoophiles
- Fetishistic zoophiles
- Sadistic bestials
- Opportunistic zoophiles
- Regular zoophiles
- Exclusive zoophiles

Romantic zoophiles, zoophilic fantasizers, and regular zoophiles are the most common, while sadistic bestials and opportunistic zoophiles are the least common.

Zoophilia may reflect childhood experimentation, sexual abuse or lack of other avenues of sexual expression. Exclusive desire for animals rather than humans is considered a rare paraphilia, and they often have other paraphilias with which they present. Zoophiles will not usually seek help for their condition, and so do not come to the attention of psychiatrists for zoophilia itself.

The first detailed studies of zoophilia date prior to 1910. Peer-reviewed research into zoophilia in its own right started around 1960. A number of the most oft-quoted studies, such as Miletski, were not published in peer-reviewed journals. There have been several significant books, from psychologists William H. Masters (1962) to Andrea Beetz (2002); their research arrived at the following conclusions:

- Most zoophiles have (or have also had) long-term human relationships as well or at the same time as bestial ones, and bestial partners are usually dogs and/or horses.
- Zoophiles' emotions and care for animals can be real, relational, authentic, and (within animals' abilities) reciprocal, and not just a substitute or means of expression. Beetz believes zoophilia is not an inclination which is chosen.
- Some researchers suggest that society in general is considerably misinformed about zoophilia, its stereotypes, and its meaning. The distinction between zoophilia and zoosadism is a critical one to these researchers, and is highlighted by each of these studies. Masters (1962), Miletski (1999) and Weinberg (2003) each comment significantly on the social harm caused by misunderstandings regarding zoophilia: "This destroy[s] the lives of many citizens".

Beetz described the phenomenon of zoophilia/bestiality as being somewhere between crime, paraphilia, and love, although she says that most research has been based on criminological reports, so the cases have frequently involved violence and psychiatric illness. She says only a few recent studies have taken data from volunteers in the community. As with all volunteer surveys and sexual ones in particular, these studies have a potential for self-selection bias.

Medical research suggests that some zoophiles only become aroused by a specific species (such as horses), some become aroused by multiple species (which may or may not include humans), and some are not attracted to humans at all.

In one study, psychiatric patients were found to have a statistically significant higher prevalence rate (55 percent) of reported bestiality, both actual sexual contacts (45 percent) and sexual fantasy (30 percent) than the control groups of medical in-patients (10 percent) and psychiatric staff (15 percent). Crépault & Couture (1980) reported that 5.3 percent of the men they surveyed had fantasized about sexual activity with an animal during heterosexual intercourse. In a 2014 study, 3% of women and 2.2% of men reported fantasies about having sex with an animal.

== Zoophiles ==
=== Non-sexual zoophilia ===
The love of animals is not necessarily sexual in nature. In psychology and sociology the word "zoophilia" is sometimes used without sexual implications. Being fond of animals in general, or as pets, is accepted in Western society, and is usually respected or tolerated. The word zoophilia is used to mean a sexual preference towards animals, which makes it a paraphilia. Some zoophiles may not act on their sexual attraction to animals. People who identify as zoophiles may feel their love for animals is romantic rather than purely sexual and say this makes them different from those committing entirely sexually motivated acts of bestiality.

=== Zoophile community ===
An online survey which recruited participants over the Internet concluded that prior to the arrival of widespread computer networking, most zoophiles would not have known other zoophiles, and for the most part, zoophiles engaged in bestiality secretly, or told only trusted friends, family, or partners. The Internet and its predecessors made people able to search for information on topics which were not otherwise easily accessible and to communicate with relative safety and anonymity. Because of the diary-like intimacy of blogs and the anonymity of the Internet, zoophiles had the ideal opportunity to "openly" express their sexuality. As with many other alternate lifestyles, broader networks began forming in the 1980s when participating in networked social groups became more common at home and elsewhere. Such developments in general were described by Markoff in 1990; the linking of computers meant that people thousands of miles apart could feel the intimacy akin to being in a small village together. The popular newsgroup alt.sex.bestiality, said to be in the top 1% of newsgroup interest (i.e. number 50 out of around 5000), – and reputedly started in humor – along with personal bulletin boards and talkers, chief among them Sleepy's multiple worlds, Lintilla, and Planes of Existence, were among the first group media of this kind in the late 1980s and early 1990s. These groups rapidly drew together zoophiles, some of whom also created personal and social websites and Internet forums. By around 1992–1994, the wide social net had evolved. This was initially centered around the above-mentioned newsgroup, alt.sex.bestiality, which during the six years following 1990 had matured into a discussion and support group. The newsgroup included information about health issues, laws governing zoophilia, bibliography relating to the subject, and community events.

Williams & Weinberg (2003) observe that the Internet can socially integrate an incredibly large number of people. In Kinsey's day contacts between animal lovers were more localized and limited to male compatriots in a particular rural community. Further, while the farm boys Kinsey researched may have been part of a rural culture in which sex with animals was a part, the sex itself did not define the community. The zoophile community is not known to be particularly large compared to other subcultures which make use of the Internet, so Williams and Weinberg (2003) surmised its aims and beliefs would likely change little as it grew. Those particularly active on the Internet may not be aware of a wider subculture, as there is not much of one; so Williams and Weinberg (2003) felt the virtual zoophile group would lead the development of the subculture.

Websites aim to provide support and social assistance to zoophiles (including resources to help and rescue abused or mistreated animals), but these are not usually well publicized. Such work is often undertaken as needed by individuals and friends, within social networks, and by word of mouth.

Zoophiles tend to experience their first zoosexual feelings during adolescence and to be secretive about them, hence limiting the ability for non-Internet-based communities to form.

== See also ==
- Animal roleplay § Erotic scenarios
- Anthrozoology – Subset of ethnobiology
- Fur fetishism – Sexual fetish relating to particular type of clothing
- Human–animal bonding – Process of development of a close, interpersonal relationship
