= Subjective report =

In experimental psychology and medical science, a subjective report is information collected from an experimental subject's description of their own experiences, symptoms or histories. Subjective reporting is the act of an individual describing their own subjective experience, following their introspection on physical or psychological effects under consideration. The method of subjective report analysis also encompasses obtaining information from a subject's own recollection, such as verbal case histories, or experiences in the individual's wider daily life.

== Investigative techniques ==
Collection of subjective reports consists simply of asking the subject to reflect on their own individual experience; subjective report techniques may vary from open-ended interviews to formal questionnaires consisting of specific, response-constrained questions or Likert items, the latter being used in quantitative and qualitative analyses. Whereas evidential, controlled methods of experimentation yield objective information on processes observable objectively by the experimenter — that is, the experimenter can observe the given effect externally through some experimental means, such as in problem-solving tasks or laboratory tests — analysis via subjective report obtains the subject's own opinion on a particular task or subject under investigation and allows study of effects outside of the scope of controlled clinical analysis.

== Applications of subjective report analysis ==
Fields that rely heavily on subjective report include social psychology; studies of sexuality (the best known of subjective report studies in this field being the Kinsey Reports); pharmacological trials of psychiatric and analgesic (pain relief) medication; and ethnography, the study of cultures and cultural processes as part of social science. A 2003 experimental study by Coghill et al determined that subjective reports of pain were capable of being correlated statistically to neuroimaging data, verifying the reports as being, for the most part, sufficiently accurate for clinical purposes. Issues of veracity of subjective reports can, however, be a limiting factor in using them to draw experimental conclusions. An example is the so called complaint bias whereby people exaggerate the extent of their self-reported negative feelings.
