= Hani Miletski =

American sexologist

Hani Miletski (born 1962) is an American sexologist, and sex therapist living in Bethesda, Maryland. She specializes as a trainer and supervisor in the field, in sex addiction, and also works within the criminal justice system. She studied at The Catholic University of America and has a doctorate from the unaccredited Institute for Advanced Study of Human Sexuality.

== Early life ==
Miletski was born in Israel, and according to her website, moved to the United States as part of the Israeli embassy staff as Assistant Senior Representative of the Defense Mission to the U.S. for Strategic Defense Initiative (SDI) Programs.

She worked within the Fogel Foundation from 1994 until 2003 before leaving to focus on her own private practice.

== Published academic work ==
Miletski published the first brief overview of mother-son incest research. She claims that mother-son incest is more common than is thought and that most mothers who commit incest are sane.

Miletski is notable for her self-published 1999 book on zoophilia. Miletski's study has never been published in any peer-reviewed journal. She once published a two-page abstract of her findings in the Scandinavian Journal of Sexology.

== Books ==
- Understanding Bestiality and Zoophilia (pub. 2002) ISBN 0-9716917-0-3 (book review)
- Mother-Son Incest: The Unthinkable Broken Taboo (a brief overview of findings, pub. 1999) ISBN 1-884444-31-8

== Articles ==
- Zoophilia: Another Sexual Orientation? Archives of sexual behavior. 46.2017,1 Pages 39-42 Published online: 10 November 2016, doi:10.1007/s10508-016-0891-3
- A history of bestiality In: Bestiality And Zoophilia: Sexual Relations With Animals (Anthrozoos) Pages. 1-22 (2005) ISBN 978-1-55753-412-5
- Is zoophilia a sexual orientation? A study In: Bestiality And Zoophilia: Sexual Relations With Animals (Anthrozoos) Pages. 82-97 (2005) ISBN 978-1-55753-412-5
- Zoophilia-Implications for Therapy Journal of Sex Education and Therapy 26.2001,2 Pages 85-89 doi:10.1080/01614576.2001.11074387

== See also ==
- Human sexuality
- Sex therapy
- Sexology
- Zoophilia
