= Biological Psychology (journal) =

- Discipline: Biological psychology
- Language: English
- Edited by: Thomas Ritz, Shulan Hsieh

Publication details
- History: 1973–present
- Publisher: Elsevier
- Frequency: 9/year
- Impact factor: 2.6 (2022)

Standard abbreviations
- ISO 4: Biol. Psychol.

Indexing
- CODEN: BLPYAX
- ISSN: 0301-0511 (print); 1873-6246 (web)
- LCCN: 97661072
- OCLC no.: 00932509

Links
- Journal homepage; Online archive

Biological Psychology is a peer-reviewed academic journal covering biological psychology published by Elsevier.

The editors-in-chief are Thomas Ritz (Southern Methodist University) and Shulan Hsieh (National Cheng Kung University). The journal publishes research on the biological aspects of psychological states and processes, including electrophysiology and neuroimaging, biochemical assessments during psychological experiments, and biologically induced changes in psychological function.

== Abstracting and indexing ==
According to the Journal Citation Reports, the journal has a 2022 impact factor of 2.6. It is abstracted and indexed in PubMed, Psychological Abstracts, BIOSIS Previews, Chemical Abstracts Service, Current Contents/Social & Behavioral Sciences, Embase, Elsevier Biobase, MEDLINE, Scopus, and the Social Sciences Citation Index.
