= Kinsey Reports =

Two books on human sexual behavior by Alfred Kinsey and others

The 1948 first edition of Sexual Behavior in the Human Male, the first of the two Kinsey Reports

The Kinsey Reports are two scholarly books on human sexual behavior, Sexual Behavior in the Human Male (1948) and Sexual Behavior in the Human Female (1953), written by Alfred Kinsey, Wardell Pomeroy, Clyde Martin, and (for Sexual Behavior in the Human Female) Paul Gebhard and published by W.B. Saunders. Kinsey was a zoologist at Indiana University and the founder of the Kinsey Institute for Research in Sex, Gender, and Reproduction (more widely known as the Kinsey Institute). Jean Brown, Cornelia Christenson, Dorothy Collins, Hedwig Leser, and Eleanor Roehr were all acknowledged as research assistants on the book's title page. Alice Field was a sex researcher, criminologist, and social scientist in New York; as a research associate for Sexual Behavior in the Human Female, she provided assistance with legal questions.

The sociological data underlying the analysis and conclusions found in Sexual Behavior in the Human Male was collected from approximately 5,300 men over a fifteen-year period. Sexual Behavior in the Human Female was based on personal interviews with approximately 6,000 women. In the latter, Kinsey analyzed data for the frequency with which women participate in various types of sexual activity and looked at how factors such as age, social-economic status, and religious adherence influence sexual behavior.

The two best-selling books were immediately controversial, both within the scientific community and the general public, because they challenged conventional beliefs about sexuality and discussed subjects that had previously been taboo. The validity of Kinsey's methods were sometimes called into question. Despite this, Kinsey's work is considered pioneering and some of the best-known sex research of all time.

== Background and method ==
Surveys of sexual behavior were unprecedented in American society, although Clelia Duel Mosher had conducted a survey of Victorian women. Qualitative studies had been done by Havelock Ellis and Magnus Hirschfeld, but these researchers did not attempt to gather quantitative data. Kinsey built up academic prestige over decades of study and gained the support of Rockefeller family-backed philanthropists for a large-scale analysis. His research was unprecedented in scale, involving 18,000 interviews.

Data was gathered primarily by means of subjective report interviews, conducted according to a structured questionnaire memorized by the experimenters (but not marked on the response sheet in any way). The response sheets were encoded in a way to maintain the confidentiality of the respondents, being entered on a blank grid using response symbols defined in advance. The data were later computerized for processing. All of this material, including the original researchers' notes, remains available from the Kinsey Institute to qualified researchers who demonstrate a need to view such materials. The institute also allows researchers to use statistical software in order to analyze the data.

== Findings ==
=== Sexual orientation ===
Parts of the Kinsey Reports regarding diversity in sexual orientations are frequently used to support the common estimate of 10% for homosexuality in the general population. Instead of three categories (heterosexual, bisexual and homosexual), a seven-point Kinsey scale system was used.

The reports also state that nearly 46% of the male subjects had "reacted" sexually to persons of both sexes in the course of their adult lives, and 37% had at least one homosexual experience. 11.6% of white men (ages 20–35) were given a rating of 3 (about equal heterosexual and homosexual experience/response) throughout their adult lives. The study also reported that 10% of American men surveyed were "more or less exclusively homosexual for at least three years between the ages of 16 and 55" (in the 5 to 6 range on the Kinsey scale).

7% of single women (ages 20–35) and 4% of previously married women (ages 20–35) were given a rating of 3 (about equal heterosexual and homosexual experience/response) on Kinsey Heterosexual-Homosexual Rating Scale for this period of their lives. 2 to 6% of women, aged 20–35, were more or less exclusively homosexual in experience/response, and 1 to 3% of unmarried women aged 20–35 were exclusively homosexual in experience/response.

=== Kinsey scale ===
The Kinsey scale, ranging from 0 to 6, represents a person's sexuality, with 0 being completely heterosexual and 6 completely homosexual. An additional category, X, was mentioned to describe those who had "no socio-sexual contacts or reactions," which has been cited by scholars to mean asexuality. The scale was first published in Sexual Behavior in the Human Male (1948) by Kinsey, Wardell Pomeroy and others, and was also prominent in the complementary work Sexual Behavior in the Human Female (1953). Introducing the scale, Kinsey wrote:

Males do not represent two discrete populations, heterosexual and homosexual. The world is not to be divided into sheep and goats. It is a fundamental of taxonomy that nature rarely deals with discrete categories [...] The living world is a continuum in each and every one of its aspects. While emphasising the continuity of the gradations between exclusively heterosexual and exclusively homosexual histories, it has seemed desirable to develop some sort of classification which could be based on the relative amounts of heterosexual and homosexual experience or response in each history... An individual may be assigned a position on this scale, for each period in his life. [...] A seven-point scale comes nearer to showing the many gradations that actually exist.

The scale is as follows:

Rating	Description
0	Exclusively heterosexual
1	Predominantly heterosexual, only incidentally homosexual
2	Predominantly heterosexual, but more than incidentally homosexual
3	Equally heterosexual and homosexual
4	Predominantly homosexual, but more than incidentally heterosexual
5	Predominantly homosexual, only incidentally heterosexual
6	Exclusively homosexual
X	No socio-sexual contacts or reactions

- Men: 11.6% of white men aged 20–35 were given a rating of 3 for this period of their lives.
- Women: 7% of single women aged 20–35 and 4% of previously married women aged 20–35 were given a rating of 3 for this period of their lives. 2 to 6% of women, aged 20–35, were given a rating of 5 and 1 to 3% of unmarried women aged 20–35 were rated as 6.

=== Marital coitus ===
The average frequency of marital sex reported by women was 2.8 times a week in the late teens, 2.2 times a week by age 30, and 1.0 times a week by age 50. Kinsey estimated that approximately 50% of all married men had extramarital sex at some time during their married lives. Among the sample, 26% of women had extramarital sex by their forties. Between 1 in 6 and 1 in 10 women from age 26 to 50 were engaged in extramarital sex. However, Kinsey classified couples who have lived together for at least a year as "married", inflating the statistics for extra-marital sex.

=== Sadomasochism ===
12% of women and 22% of men reported having an erotic response to a sadomasochistic story.

=== Biting ===
Responses to being bitten:

Erotic Responses	By Women	By Men
Definite and/or frequent	26%	26%
Some response	29%	24%
Never	45%	50%
Number of cases	2200	567

=== Zoophilia ===
The report estimated the amount of American citizens that have engaged in zoophilia to be approximately eight million.

== Criticism ==
Kinsey's statistics in his Reports have been criticized both at the time he published and today. Although Kinsey sought to work on a more complete report involving 100,000 interviews and considered the initial 1948 publication to be a sample progress report, academics have criticized the sample selection and sample bias in the reports' methodology. The main issues cited by researchers are that Kinsey did not use random sampling procedures when collecting his data, that significant portions of his samples come from prison populations and male prostitutes, and that people who volunteer to be interviewed about taboo subjects are likely to create a self-selection bias. These issues would undermine the usefulness of the sample in terms of determining the tendencies of the overall population.

=== Statistics ===
In 1948, the same year as the original publication, a committee of the American Statistical Association, including notable statisticians such as John Tukey, condemned the sampling procedure. In a tense meeting with Kinsey, Tukey supposedly declared that even a sample as small as three to five, chosen randomly, would be preferable to hundreds in Kinsey's sample. In 1954, leading statisticians, including William Gemmell Cochran, Frederick Mosteller, John Tukey, and W. O. Jenkins issued for the American Statistical Association a critique of Kinsey's 1948 Male report, stating:

Critics are justified in their objections that many of the most interesting and provocative statements in the [Kinsey 1948] book are not based on the data presented therein, and it is not made clear to the reader on what evidence the statements are based. Further, the conclusions drawn from data presented in the book are often stated by KPM [Kinsey, Pomeroy, and Martin] in much too bold and confident a manner. Taken cumulatively, these objections amount to saying that much of the writing in the book falls below the level of good scientific writing.

In response, Paul Gebhard, Kinsey's close colleague, "Sexual Behavior in the Human Female" co-author, and successor as director of the Kinsey Institute for Sex Research, cleaned the Kinsey data of purported contaminants, removing, for example, all material derived from prison populations in the basic sample. (Gebhard had, while working with Kinsey, raised serious concerns about the use of prison populations especially, but had been shot down by Kinsey at the time.) In 1979, Gebhard (with Alan B. Johnson) published The Kinsey Data: Marginal Tabulations of the 1938–1963 Interviews Conducted by the Institute for Sex Research. Their conclusion, to Gebhard's surprise, was that none of Kinsey's original estimates were significantly affected by this bias: that is, the prison population and male prostitutes had the same statistical tendencies as the rest of the men Kinsey interviewed. The results were summarized by historian, playwright, and gay-rights activist Martin Duberman: "Instead of Kinsey's 37% (men who had at least one homosexual experience), Gebhard and Johnson came up with 36.4%; the 10% figure (men who were "more or less exclusively homosexual for at least three years between the ages of 16 and 55"), with prison inmates excluded, came to 9.9% for white, college-educated men and 12.7% for those with less education.

Kinsey himself was extremely frustrated by the criticisms of his sampling procedures, because he maintained that there was no way to do a successful study about sex using random probability sampling. As Kinsey biographer Jonathan Gathorne-Hardy points out, because of the sensitive nature of a sex study, contacting a truly random sample will garner a very high refusal rate—as modern sex studies using random sampling have shown. If the study is trying to gather information about any sort of population subgroups, as Kinsey was, the small percentages of the population plus the high rates of refusal may make these subgroups effectively disappear, despite their importance to the study.

For some forty years, scientists of all persuasions have scrutinized and analyzed the two Kinsey reports. Some conclusions are close to unanimous. According to Edward Brecher, author of The Sex Researchers, 'Whatever their shortcomings, the Kinsey data remain today the fullest and most reliable sampling of human sexual behavior in a large population...' (Francoeur Part III 52)

=== Volunteer bias ===
In the 1950s, psychologist Abraham Maslow stated that Kinsey did not consider "volunteer bias." The data represented only those volunteering to participate in discussion of taboo topics. Most Americans were reluctant to discuss the intimate details of their sex lives even with their spouses and close friends. Before the publication of Kinsey's reports, Maslow tested Kinsey's volunteers for bias. He concluded that Kinsey's sample was unrepresentative of the general population.

The charge of an over-reliance on volunteers is also critiqued in the Gathorne-Hardy biography. All surveys rely on volunteers. Kinsey attempted to correct for this by gathering as many "100 percent groups" as he could—that is, collecting all (or nearly all) of the sex histories of a given group that had gathered together for reasons other than sex, such as law societies, sororities, or even a small group of hikers. Kinsey would ask the president or leader of the group to agree to an interview, and then that leader's influence would get him an initial batch of volunteers from the group, a second batch who did not want to be seen volunteering but would agree to be interviewed, and then a third batch brought in by, essentially, peer pressure. While all the participants were still volunteers, he got interviews and thus samples he would not have otherwise gotten. In addition, the groups themselves, though any one was not representative of the population as a whole, provided a random element while encouraging greater participation. These "100 percent groups" made up about a quarter of Kinsey's overall data.

=== Other criticisms ===
More recent researchers have also criticized Kinsey's sampling methods and believe that he overestimated the frequency of nonheterosexual behaviors and attractions, because the Kinsey Reports show higher frequencies of homosexuality than more modern studies do. This may be explained in part by Kinsey's interview style, which focused on in-depth conversations with subjects carried out by himself or highly trained members of his team; they emphasized creating rapport with the interviewee and making them feel comfortable and secure. Modern interviewers tend to be less thoroughly trained and emphasize scientific detachment, which may make respondents less likely to share sensitive personal details.

It has been suggested that some data in the reports could not have been obtained without collaborations with pedophiles. The Kinsey Institute denies this charge, though it acknowledges that men who have had sexual experiences with children were interviewed, with Kinsey balancing what he saw as the need for their anonymity to solicit "honest answers on such taboo subjects" against the likelihood that their crimes would continue.

Sociologist Edward Laumann stated that the Kinsey Reports were limited to the biology of sex and lacked psychological and clinical information and analysis and that this "meant that sex research did not move into the mainstream of academic credibility. People took their reputations in their hands if they attempted to pursue it." Laumann also acknowledged that "The Kinsey report was a cultural event of enormous consequence."

American literary critic Lionel Trilling, besides criticizing the methodology for the interviews, and the lack of cultural perspective of Kinsey's approach, made the following comment on the public for the reports: "With this public, science is authority. It has been trained to accept heedlessly 'what science says', which it conceives to be a unitary utterance."

== Context and significance ==
Only 5,000 copies of Sexual Behavior in the Human Male were initially printed in 1948, and its success surprised the publisher. The popular late-1948 Cole Porter song "Too Darn Hot" makes reference to it. Prior to the release of the second report in 1953, the first book had sold over 265,000 copies in the United States. Together, the Kinsey Reports sold three-quarters of a million copies, were translated into thirteen languages and may be considered as belonging to the most successful and influential scientific books of the 20th century. They were associated with a change in the public perception of sexuality, in conjunction with Masters and Johnson's texts about their 1960s investigations into the physiology of sex, breaking taboos and misapprehensions.

== See also ==
- Kinsey, a film based on the life of Alfred Kinsey
- Klein Sexual Orientation Grid
