= Wardell Pomeroy =

American psychologist

Wardell Baxter Pomeroy (December 6, 1913 – September 6, 2001) was an American sexologist. He was a frequent co-author with Alfred C. Kinsey.

== Biography ==
Pomeroy was born in Kalamazoo, Michigan, the son of Percy W. and Mary A. Pomeroy. He graduated from Indiana University (BA, 1935; MA, 1942) and earned a Ph.D. in psychology in 1954 from Columbia University. While working as a psychologist in an Indiana state hospital, he met Kinsey and came to work on his seminal sex-research project. Pomeroy personally recorded approximately 6,000 sexual histories. He was co-author with Kinsey on the landmark books Sexual Behavior in the Human Male (1948) and Sexual Behavior in the Human Female (1953). He went into the private practice of sex therapy in New York City in 1963 and wrote books about adolescent sexuality for popular consumption. In 1976, he became dean of the Institute for the Advanced Study of Human Sexuality and an adjunct professor at California Medical School and California State University at Northridge. In 1978 he was on the board of advisors for Rupert Raj's Foundation for The Advancement of Canadian Transsexuals (F.A.C.T.) Pomeroy retired due to declining health in 1983 and died in Bloomington, Indiana of Lewy body dementia.

Pomeroy was portrayed in the 2004 theatrical film Kinsey by Chris O'Donnell.

== Bibliography ==
- A.C. Kinsey, W.B. Pomeroy, C.E. Martin, Sexual Behavior in the Human Male, (Philadelphia, PA: W.B. Saunders, 1948). ISBN 0-253-33412-8.
- A.C. Kinsey, W.B. Pomeroy, C.E. Martin, P.H. Gebhard, Sexual Behavior in the Human Female, (Philadelphia, PA: W.B. Saunders, 1953). ISBN 0-253-33411-X.
- Boys and Sex (New York: Delacorte, 1968) ISBN 0-385-30250-9
- Girls and Sex (New York: Delacorte, 1970) ISBN 0-385-30251-7
- Dr. Kinsey and the Institute for Sex Research (New York: Harper and Row, 1972) ISBN 0-300-02916-0
- Your Child and Sex: A Guide for Parents (New York: Delacorte, 1974) ISBN 0-440-08109-2

== Reception ==
Pomeroy's Boys and Sex and Girls and Sex books have frequently been banned or challenged. Both books landed on the American Library Association's list of most frequently banned and challenged books from 1990 to 1999. Boys and Sex landed the 61st position, and Girls and Sex landed the 98th position.
