= Colin J. Williams =

Colin John Anthony Williams (born c. 1941) is a sociologist and retired Professor of Sociology at Indiana University-Purdue University at Indianapolis. He served as Research Sociologist at the Kinsey Institute for Sex Research from 1968 to 1980. Williams' work frequently looks at sociological issues affecting gay, lesbian, bisexual and transgender people.

== Life and career ==
Williams earned his bachelor's degree from the London School of Economics in 1963 and his master's degree from the University of British Columbia in 1966. He earned his Ph.D. in sociology from Rutgers University in 1970.

== Selected books ==
- Homosexuals and the Military (1971)
- Male Homosexuals: Their Problems and Adaptations (1974)
- Sex and Morality in the U.S. (1989)
- Dual Attraction: Understanding Bisexuality (1994)
