= Martin S. Weinberg =

American sociologist

- Born: Martin Stephen Weinberg; January 23, 1939 (age 87); Albany, New York
- Occupations: Sociologist and sex researcher
- Notable work: Homosexualities; Sexual Preference

Martin Stephen Weinberg (born January 23, 1939) is an American sociologist whose work frequently involves human sexuality. His major areas of interest include sociology of the body, sociology of deviance and control, and interpretive sociology.

== Life and career ==
Weinberg earned a bachelor's degree from St. Lawrence University in 1960 and a master's degree in 1961 from University of Massachusetts Amherst. He earned his Ph.D. in sociology from Northwestern University in 1965. He began his teaching career that year at Northwestern, then worked as assistant professor at Rutgers University from 1965 to 1968. From 1968 to 1980 he served as a senior research sociologist at the Kinsey Institute. During that time he was also faculty in the sociology department as associate professor from 1968 to 1974. He became a full professor in 1974. He has served as visiting professor at State University of New York at Albany (1981), University of Maryland at Baltimore County (1985–1988), and University of Auckland (1998 and 2003).

In 1995 Weinberg received the International Distinguished Scientific Achievement Award from the Society for the Scientific Study of Sexuality, which made him a Fellow in 1999. He is a charter member of the International Academy of Sex Research. In 2002 he received the Simon-Gagnon Award for Outstanding Contributions to the Study of Sexualities from the American Sociological Association.

In 2004 he won the Magnus Hirschfeld Medal for Outstanding Contributions to Sexual Science from the German Society for Social-Scientific Sexuality Research.

== Selected bibliography ==
- Sexual Preference: Its Development in Men and Women
- Homosexualities: A Study of Diversity Among Men and Women
- Homosexuality: An Annotated Bibliography
- Deviance: The Interactionist Perspective
- The Study of Social Problems: Seven Perspectives
- Male Homosexuals: Their Problems and Adaptations
- Dual Attraction: Understanding Bisexuality
- Sex Research: Studies from the Kinsey Institute
- Gay baths and the social organization of impersonal sex
- Homosexual identity: Commitment, adjustment, and significant others
- Social Constituents of Sadomasochism

== See also ==
- Alan P. Bell
