= Alan P. Bell =

American psychologist

Alan Paul Bell (January 18, 1932 – May 13, 2002 (age 70)) was an American psychologist who worked at the Kinsey Institute.

Bell was born in Newark, New Jersey on January 18, 1932. He earned an undergraduate degree from University of the South and a master's degree from General Theological Seminary. In 1964 he earned a doctorate from Columbia University. He was the father of violinist Joshua Bell.

== Selected works ==
- The Personality of a Child Molester: An Analysis of Dreams (1971)
- Homosexuality: An Annotated Bibliography (1972)
- Homosexualities: A Study of Diversity Among Men and Women (1978)
- Sexual Preference (1981)
