= Media portrayal of asexuality =

The portrayals of asexuality in the media reflect societal attitudes towards asexuality, reflected in the existing media portrayals. Throughout history, asexual characters have appeared in television series, animated series, literature, comics, video games, music, and film.

Asexual representation in the media is limited and rarely openly acknowledged or confirmed by creators or authors. Representation for asexual people in fiction has been mixed, with strong prejudice against asexuals, asexual erasure, and few asexual characters in media. This is because many characters are "suspected to be asexual" but are not explicitly stated as asexual, while other asexual characters are secondary and are not protagonists. In a 2015 article, Lauren Jankowski stated that while more characters have appeared in TV and films, their asexuality is often portrayed as a fixable problem, as tropes for asexual and aromantic people are common. Jankowski further argued that not having asexuals engage in media portrayals of asexuality has resulted in "grossly inaccurate and damaging depictions of this orientation."

== Animated series ==
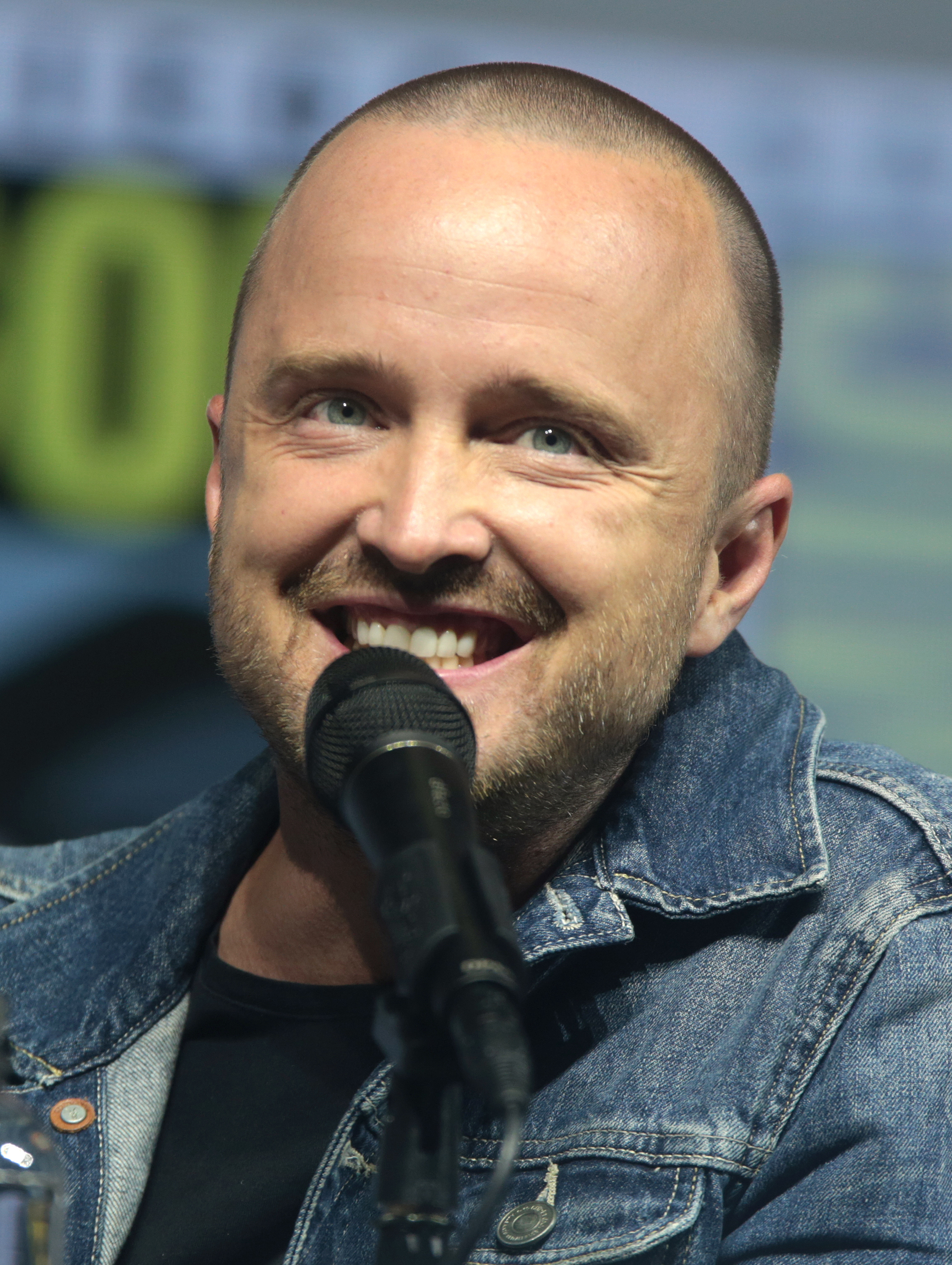
Aaron Paul speaking at the 2018 San Diego Comic-Con, Paul voiced Todd Chavez in Bojack Horseman.

In 2014 and 2019, it was confirmed that Owen Burnett in the 1990s series, Gargoyles was asexual.

In 2017, GLAAD started counting, for the first time, non-binary and asexual characters, noting that in the past, characters of these identities were "often relegated to one-off episodes, which did not allow for nuanced exploration." In the same report, they noted that while Jughead Jones is arguably asexual in his depictions by Archie Comics, the series by The CW is not making him asexual, adding that "the ace community remains nearly invisible in media." They pointed to Raphael Santiago in Shadowhunters as the "only asexual character...on all of cable television" and Todd Chavez in BoJack Horseman, describing him as "the only asexual character on streaming originals," adding that he is the first GLAAD counted since they began counting streaming services in 2014. Chavez was revealed, at the end of the show's third season, to be asexual, which was further elaborated in the 4th season of the series and has been generally well accepted by the asexual community for its methods of positive representation. The following year, GLAAD found one asexual character, Todd on BoJack Horseman, on American cable television and streaming platforms while Vox reported that asexual characters in popular media has a large impact on the asexual community, and described the history of asexual representation as "short and shallow." This was also reflected in GLAAD's reports in 2018 and 2019, noting that no additional asexual characters had been added, with Todd as the only asexual characters in broadcast and streaming services in 2019. This did not account for Yolanda Buenaventura, an asexual friend of Todd.

Todd Chavez in Bojack Horseman is one of the most prominent examples of asexual characters in popular culture. Alastor in the mature adult animation, Hazbin Hotel, Peridot in Steven Universe, and SpongeBob SquarePants in SpongeBob SquarePants have also been confirmed as asexual. Hazbin Hotel series creator Vivienne Medrano confirmed him as asexual and aromantic. On her Twitter, storyboard artist Maya Petersen stated that Peridot is asexual and aromantic on her Twitter, even though she said her word is not "the ultimate authority" on the matter. This asexual identity was never expressed in the show directly. It is complicated by the fact that fans shipping Peridot with various other characters, specifically Lapis Lazuli and Amethyst, some reviewers even seeing Peridot and Lapis in a "close, loving relationship" in the past. In an interview with Stephen Hillenburg in 2002, he stated that SpongeBob, who was under speculation (2002) and later controversy (2005) because of claims that he and his best friend, Patrick were gay, is neither gay or straight but in fact is asexual. This was once again clarified in 2005, because of controversy about SpongeBob and Patrick's sexual orientations. Hillenburg also instructed that SpongeBob should never have a love interest or romantic relationship, since he is asexual (as all real-life sea sponges are) and too innocent for it.

In 2020, Erica Mendez, a Mexican-American voice actress who has voiced in English dubs for Funimation, Bang Zoom! and Studiopolis, said she identified as asexual. In the eighth episode of The Case Files of Jeweler Richard, Shouko Tanimoto, reveals she is asexual and aromantic indirectly, confessing she has never felt romantic attraction. After being asked if she really wants to marry Homura, she says that she does not know what it means to like someone in a different way than her mom and dad, and adds that "...choosing not to fall in love and never understanding it in the first place aren't the same." Her asexual identity was never expressed in the show directly.

In 2021, the character Lilith Clawthorne from the animated series The Owl House was confirmed as asexual by her voice actor, Cissy Jones, on an Instagram live.

In 2025, the character Viktor from the animated series Arcane was confirmed by creator Christian Linke to be asexual, however, some fans believe this is problematic due to the stereotype that disabled people cannot engage in sex.

== Film ==
The first mainstream feature film to include a canonically asexual character would be Roman Polanski's 1965 British psychological horror film Repulsion, in which main character Carole Ledoux (played by Catherine Deneuve) is a beautiful but shy, eccentric and withdrawn sex-repulsed asexual woman. While some critics and reviewers have noted the film's exploration into the life of a person who does not find sex interesting but rather unpleasant, there is some slight contention surrounding the categorization of Carole as asexual; while canonically asexual, the character is also portrayed as mentally ill and dangerous, and so bothered by sex that she cannot even tolerate the knowledge that her sister and sister's boyfriend repeatedly have sex so loudly that she can hear it. In the film's ending, during which Carole's sister's boyfriend (named Michael) comforts her and carries her away from a judgmental crowd, his compassion is the first time during which she is portrayed as trusting of a man, having had a vague but traumatic and unspoken sexual encounter (implied molestation event) as a child with a much older relative. With this in mind, some critics hold the view that Carole has a phobia of sex caused by trauma rather than being a sex-repulsed asexual, while other critics consider her asexual, or have argued that a person can be an abuse survivor and asexual without one having caused the other, a debate that considers the nuances and individual lived experiences that make each person's sexuality different.

The 1982 black comedy Eating Raoul is considered by many to be one of the first blatant examples of an asexual character in a feature film. Main character Paul is a romantic asexual while his wife, Mary, is revealed throughout the story to be a heterosexual woman who stays with Paul simply because she loves him romantically, even though the two never have sex. While Paul is portrayed as paunchy, balding and middle-aged, Mary is portrayed as a physically beautiful blonde nurse, challenging relationship conventions and also portraying the emotional bond between an asexual and a non-asexual.

Matthew Goode, who portrayed Adrian Veidt / Ozymandias in the 2009 film Watchmen, has stated that he portrayed the character as being asexual. He also described the character's sexuality as "ambiguous". This was also reflected in the Watchmen TV series.

A 2014 film, The Olivia Experiment, revolves around a 27-year-old grad student named Olivia (played by Skye Noel) who thinks she is asexual, with her asexuality often "questioned and doubted", treated as something temporary. As such, she is encouraged to find a way to fit herself "into an allosexual narrative" rather than be asexual.

== Literature ==
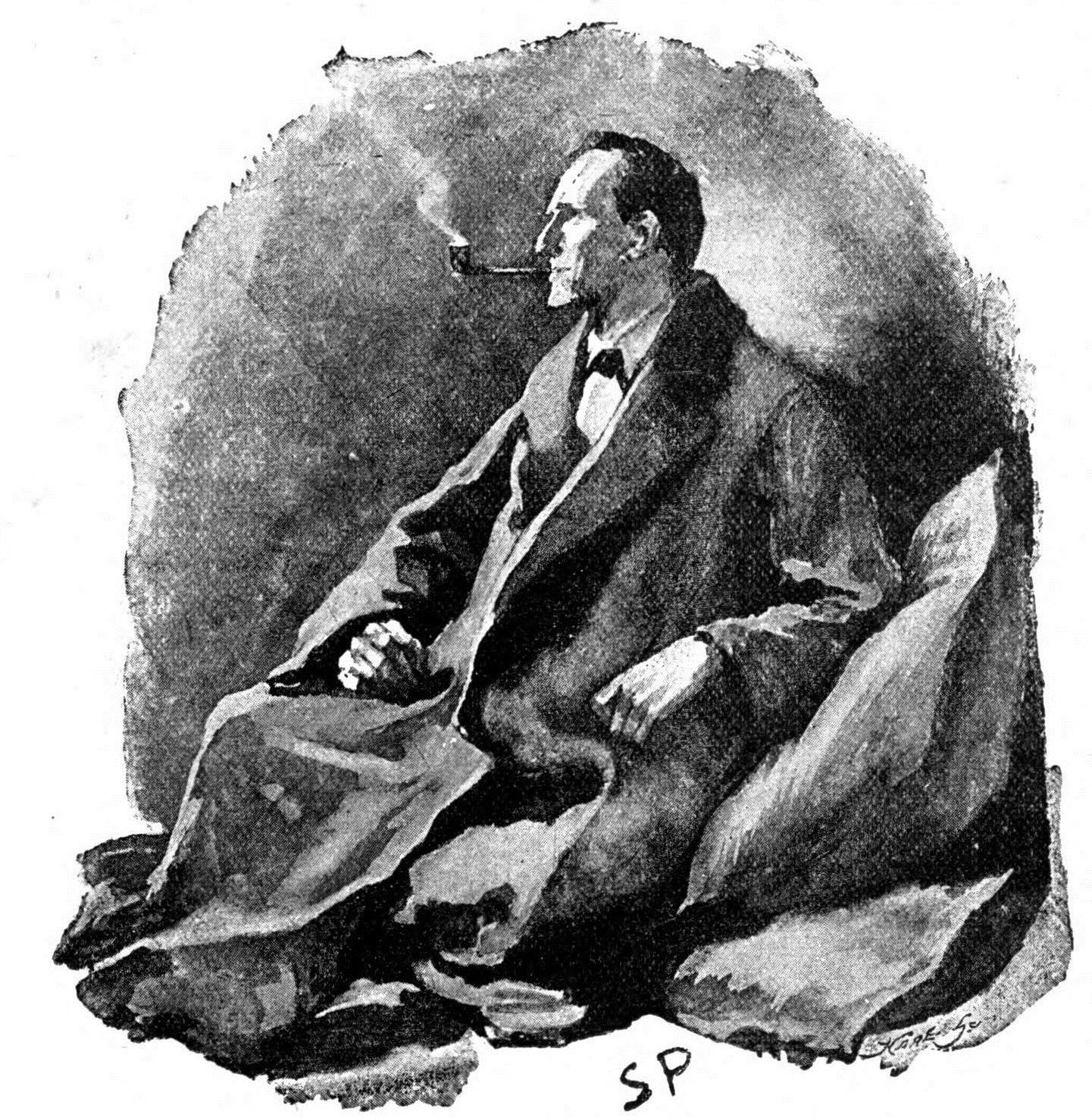
Sir Arthur Conan Doyle intentionally portrayed his character Sherlock Holmes as what would today be classified as asexual.

In works composed prior to the beginning of the twenty-first century, characters are generally automatically assumed to be (allo)sexual and the existence of a character's sexuality is usually never questioned. Several legendary characters are often interpreted as being aroace, including the Greek goddesses Hestia, Athena, Artemis, and Hecate and Kay, Galahad, Bors, the Grail heroine (Percival's sister), and Dinadan in Arthurian legend. Some researchers have found asexual resonances in the writings of 17th-century French poet Catherine Bernard. Arthur Conan Doyle portrayed his character Sherlock Holmes as what would today be classified as asexual, with the intention to characterize him as solely driven by intellect and immune to the desires of the flesh. Sue Bridehead in Thomas Hardy's 1895 novel, Jude the Obscure is portrayed as having an active aversion to sex and is considered by some to be an asexual character.

There are various openly asexual authors, such as short story writer Morgan Bell, English model Yasmin Benoit, and YouTube personality Julie Sondra Decker. New Zealand writer Keri Hulme, the late atheist blogger Niki Massey and video game writer Mikey Neumann also identify as asexual.

The 1976 Paul Zindel young adult coming-of-age novel Pardon Me, You're Stepping on My Eyeball! features a canonically asexual character, protagonist Edna Shinglebox, although the direct term "asexual" is not used (did not exist at the time the book was written). Instead, Edna's liberal, sex-positive parents worry that their daughter is "prudish" and that her total lack of interest in sex is a mental health issue. Edna does meet a boyfriend, eccentric student Louis "Marsh" Mellow, but she never expresses interest in sex with him and admits that she has no interest in sex; the two characters remain friends anyway. Kirkus Reviews made note of the harsh way in which Edna is treated for her lack of sexual interest, stating, "pretty but withdrawn Edna's only problem is her mother's pushy obsession with her getting a boyfriend."

In 2017, Book Riot, highlighted a small number of books with asexual characters. Book Riot pointed to characters in Laini Taylor's Days of Blood & Starlight, J.L. Douglas's Lunaside, R. J. Anderson's Quicksilver, and Seanan McGuire's Every Heart a Doorway. Tor.com pointed to some of the same books but also highlighted asexual characters in Guardian of the Dead, Banner of the Damned, and Clariel. In 2018, Bustle pointed to three writers who had books with asexual protagonists: Kathryn Ormsbee (Tash Hearts Tolstoy), Claire Kann (Let's Talk About Love), and Alice Oseman (Radio Silence). Oseman's 2020 novel Loveless specifically deals with the protagonist coming to terms with her asexual and aromantic identity while at university. Victoria 'Tori' Spring, a recurring character in their books, was also confirmed asexual in a Tumblr publication.

=== Comics ===
The Archie Comics character Jughead Jones was likely intended by his creators as an asexual foil to Archie's excessive heterosexuality, but, over the years, this portrayal shifted, with various iterations and reboots of the series implying that he is either gay or heterosexual. In 2016, he was confirmed to be asexual in the New Riverdale Jughead comics. The writers of the 2017 television show Riverdale, based on the Archie comics, chose to depict Jughead as a heterosexual despite pleas from both fans and Jughead actor Cole Sprouse to retain Jughead's asexuality and allow the asexual community to be represented alongside the gay and bisexual communities, both represented in the show. This decision sparked conversations about deliberate asexual erasure in the media and its consequences, especially on younger viewers.

Other webcomics had asexual characters. In 2015, Alix was introduced in Sex Criminals. While other characters in the story are able to freeze time when they orgasm, Alix freezes time through the adrenaline rush of BASE jumping. In 2019, Bo came out to her friend, Lola, in an issue of the Dutch teen dramedy romance webcomic Acception. The same year, Diane, in issue #68 of Lumberjanes, says to Hes: "...I like you too. But I don't have any interest in kissing or junk like that" and has never had interest in kissing anyone. On the following page, she still says she has romantic feelings toward Hes, but not sexual ones.

Edward St. John Gorey, an American writer and artist noted for his illustrated books, is asexual. When asked what his sexual orientation was in an interview, he said that he is "neither one thing nor the other particularly...apparently reasonably undersexed or something." Edward Gorey agreed in an interview that the "sexlessness" of his works was a product of his asexuality. Similarly, American cartoonist, Maia Kobabe, is queer, nonbinary, asexual. and uses Spivak pronouns.

== Live-action television ==
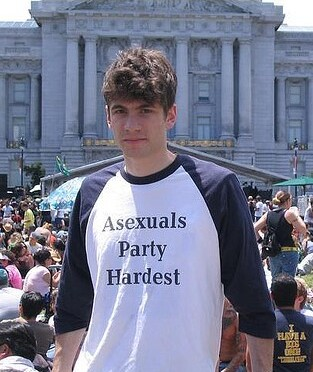
A picture of the asexual activist David Jay in June 2006

Gilligan, the eponymous character of the 1960s television series Gilligan's Island, would today be classified as asexual. The producers of the show likely portrayed him in this way to make him more relatable to young male viewers of the show who had not yet reached puberty and had therefore presumably not yet experienced sexual desire. Gilligan's asexual nature also allowed the producers to orchestrate intentionally comedic situations in which Gilligan spurns the advances of attractive females. Asexuality as a sexual identity, rather than as a biological entity, became more widely discussed in the media in the beginning of the twenty-first century. The Fox Network series House represented an "asexual" couple in the episode "Better Half". However, this representation has been questioned by members of the asexual community (including David Jay, the founder of the Asexual Visibility and Education Network), calling it "disturbing but not unexpected," while others, in a petition to FOX executives, wrote that the episode encourages viewers to see asexuality skeptically, rather than accept it, "to probe asexual people for causes of our 'condition' rather than to accept us as a part of the natural spectrum of human sexual diversity." This led to controversy over the representation and a petition on change.org for Fox Network to reconsider how it represents asexual characters in the future, stating it "represented asexuality very poorly by attributing it to both medical illness and deception."

In a 2013 episode, the character Evan Waxman proclaims his asexual identity upon his first appearance in of the web series High Maintenance; the character, portrayed by Avery Monsen, reappears in several episodes, including the series' subsequent continuation on HBO. In the 2010s series, Faking It, Brad briefly exclaims his orientation in an episode about labels. In a fourth series episode of Game of Thrones, the spymaster Varys (Conleth Hill) derides the role of "desire" in plunging Westeros into civil war, and the show distinguishes him from other eunuch characters by stating his asexuality prior to his castration, and portraying his celibacy after.

In 2017, on the British soap opera Emmerdale, 15-year-old character Liv Flaherty revealed that she fancies neither boys nor girls, leading to speculation that she might be asexual. Additionally, the television series Shadowhunters, based on the book series The Mortal Instruments, includes the asexual character Raphael Santiago and Norman Reedus, who voices Daryl Dixon in The Walking Dead, stated that he reads the character as asexual. At the same time, Valentina "Voodoo" Dunacci in Sirens, was the "focus of a major storyline" where she has a strong bond with Brian, who is not "asexual but is hopelessly in love with Val." while Florence in Sex Education calls asexuality when "someone has no sexual attraction to any sex or gender," but that it is not the be-all, end-all of relationships.

In the tenth episode of the seventh season of American superhero series Legends of Tomorrow, broadcast in January 2022, one of the main characters, Esperanza "Spooner" Cruz, stated that she does not feel attraction to any gender, leading to a conversation where she identifies as asexual. The Imperfects featured an asexual succubus character in 2022.

In early 2022, a Japanese drama series centered around asexuality and aromanticism, Koisenu Futari (As Two People Who Can't Fall in Love), was produced by NHK. The main characters, Sakuko and Takahashi, both aroace (short for aromantic asexual), start living together for convenience and raise awareness around them, educating family and friends, as they try to reinvent what it means to be a family.

Indian actress, Sriti Jha identifies as asexual as does television personality Caitlyn Jenner, stand-up comedian Paula Poundstone, and Japanese model and actor Satsuki Nakayama.

In Becoming Karl Lagerfeld (2024), Karl Lagerfeld (Daniel Brühl) is portrayed as asexual.

== Music ==
Cavetown has stated that he is asexual, aromantic, and transgender. Another musician, Bradford Cox, has described himself as gay, though he previously has stated that he leads a non-sexual/asexual lifestyle. However, in a 2011 interview with Rolling Stone, Cox said that he no longer identifies as asexual but rather as queer: "For a long time I just said I was asexual, but now I just realized that... I'm still, I guess... I mean, I'm queer. I just sort of, don't really have a very big self-esteem, so asexuality is sort of like a comfort zone where you don't get rejected." Cox stated in an October 19, 2016, radio interview: "There's so many types of sexuality, but one that I think is overlooked is to be asexual. I am absolutely asexual. I am a virgin at 34 years old."

== Radio ==
In 2020, Sir Fitzroy Maplecourt, in the podcast The Adventure Zone: Graduation, is portrayed by Griffin McElroy, who said in a Q&A episode that he thinks of Fitzroy as asexual. The same year, Jet Sikuliaq, in The Penumbra Podcast was confirmed as asexual and aromantic. Also, Jonathan Sims in The Magnus Archives, the head archivist of the Magnus Institute, has also been described as biromantic. His voice actor, Jonathan Sims, noted that although he's asexual, Jon wouldn't actively identify as such.

== Video games ==
In 2019, The Outer Worlds, Parvati Holcomb, crew and party member on the Player's ship "The Unreliable," acting as the ship's engineer, expresses professional and later romantic interest in Junlei Tennyson (chief engineer of a major space station in the game), and they become a couple. Narrative designer Kate Dollarhyde, an asexual woman who is also biromantic, was excited they were inheriting this character, saying she was glad to "bring that personal experience to the audience," making her character different from other companions. In the quest, The Unplanned Variable, the player character has the option to relate to Parvati's feelings about sexual intimacy, and can add that, unlike her, they are not interested in romance, too.

In In Stars and Time (2023), the protagonist Siffrin and party member Mirabelle are both asexual. In a scene, the two characters converse about their feelings on their asexuality and their world's expectations. This, and other queer interactions have been lauded as being particularly genuine and vulnerable with its feelings.

== Web series ==
Evan Edinger, an American-born YouTuber based in London, England, identifies as being on the asexual spectrum, near demisexual. Edinger is known for his "British VS American" series, in which he compares topics such as exams, healthcare systems and taxes with guest YouTubers from Britain. Additionally, Percival King / Percy in the web series, Epithet Erased is a police officer with a strict moral code, values order and safety, and is asexual. The creator of the show, Brendan Blaber, confirmed that she is asexual and may also be aromantic. He also said that while Percy is female and asexual, it was his "intention to leave everything beyond that point up to the viewer," adding that headcanons of fans that she is trans, non-binary, autistic, or anything else, is valid.

=== Actual play ===
Caduceus Clay, in the actual play series Critical Role, is asexual and aromantic. In episode 114 of campaign 2, he states that "[sex] is not really my thing". Player Taliesin Jaffe tweeted in support of Asexual Awareness Week in regards to the character and then confirmed on the aftershow Talks Machina that he planned on the character being asexual from the beginning but had waited for an organic moment to reveal it. In episode 14 of the actual play series Dimension 20: A Crown of Candy, Liam Wilhelmina comes out to his father as asexual.

== See also ==
- Timeline of asexual history
