= List of fictional asexual characters =

This is a list of asexual characters in fiction, i.e. fictional characters that either self-identify as asexual or have been identified by outside parties to be asexual. Listed characters may also be aromantic. Not listed are celibate but not asexual characters or non-human characters, such as non-sexual computers or aliens in science-fiction.

== Animation and anime ==
| Characters | Title | Character debut date | Notes | Country |
|---|---|---|---|---|
| Alastor | Hazbin Hotel | October 28, 2019 | Alastor, also known as the Radio Demon, is asexual. | United States |
| Yolanda Buenaventura | BoJack Horseman | September 8, 2017 | In the season 4 episode, "What Time Is It Right Now", Yolanda reveals that she is asexual when she asks Todd out on a date. She is first seen in the background of an asexual meetup in the episode "Hooray! Todd episode!". | United States |
| Todd Chavez | BoJack Horseman | August 22, 2014 | In the season 3 finale, "That Went Well", Todd confides in his friend Emily that he does not think he is either straight or gay, and in fact "might be nothing". He explores the identity further in season 4 and accepts his asexuality, while meeting others who share his orientation. Todd was the only asexual character GLAAD found on streaming platforms in 2018. | United States |
| Lilith Clawthorne | The Owl House | February 7, 2020 | Eda's older sister and former leader of the Emperor's Coven. In a charity livestream hosted by series creator Dana Terrace on March 13, 2022, a specially produced audio, written by Terrace and recorded by Cissy Jones in character as Lilith, was played. In this audio, Lilith claims to have never felt romantic attraction towards anyone before. Later prompted by Jade King of TheGamer, Jones stated that her audio during the charity stream was "basically canon." Jones would make further allusion to Lilith's aromantic orientation over Twitter, before giving direct affirmation of the character's asexuality on March 18, over Instagram. | United States |
| Elijah | Big Mouth | October 28, 2022 | In the sixth season of Big Mouth, Elijah is introduced as an asexual religious African-American kid who Missy is in love with. | United States |
| Mammon | Helluva Boss | October 29, 2023 | Mammon is the Sin of Greed. Official art posted for Pride Month in 2024 depicted him with the colors of the asexual pride flag. | United States |
| Maude | BoJack Horseman | October 25, 2019 | In the season 6 episode "The Face Of Depression", Maude is shown breaking up with her then boyfriend, implying that it was due to a lack of sexual interest. BoJack encourages her to download Todd's asexual dating app "All About That Ace" where she matches with Todd and begins a relationship. | United States |
| Octavia | Helluva Boss | December 9, 2020 | Octavia is Stolas' teenage daughter. Official art posted for Pride Month in 2024 depicted her with the colors of the asexual pride flag. | United States |
| Peridot | Steven Universe | January 8, 2015 | Based on the gemstone peridot, Peridot is a member of an alien species known as gems. Gems are able to "fuse" with one another into singular, gestalt entities known as fusions. However, Peridot is actively disinterested in fusing. According to storyboard artist Maya Petersen, this story element is a metaphor for asexuality and aromanticism, even though she said her word is not "the ultimate authority" on the matter. This aromantic identity was never expressed in the show overtly, with fans shipping Peridot with various other characters, specifically Lapis Lazuli and Amethyst, some reviewers even seeing Peridot and Lapis in a "close, loving relationship" in the past. | United States |
| Seiji Maki | Bloom Into You | October 5, 2018 | A supporting character, he is an aromantic asexual with well established feelings on sex and romance, and is a "crucial sounding board" for Yuu as she tries to figure out her feelings. In the ninth episode, he says that he does not fall in love, but prefers to watch from the outside. He enjoys romance but does not wish to partake it in himself. | Japan |
| SpongeBob SquarePants | SpongeBob SquarePants | May 1, 1999 | The eponymous character was confirmed to be asexual according to interviews from show creator Stephen Hillenburg in 2002 and 2005. Although SpongeBob's sexuality is confirmed as asexual, he is not a sexless organism–– In the episode "Sleepy Time", SpongeBob's boating license (which is revoked at the end of the episode) lists his sex as male. Moreover, he is confirmed to be a yellow tube sponge (Aplysina fistularis), a species of sponge capable of sexual reproduction in addition to asexual reproduction. Hillenburg also insisted that SpongeBob should never be in a relationship. | United States |
| Viktor | Arcane | November 6, 2021 | Co-creator Christian Linke revealed in an interview that he had always seen Viktor as asexual and that it was something that had been talked about since the start. | United States |

== Film ==
| Characters | Title / Franchise | Actors | Years | Notes | Country |
|---|---|---|---|---|---|
| Levi Danube | Something in the Dirt | Justin Benson | 2022 | Levi's character admits to being asexual in the film, saying "I've never been attracted to anyone. And that is a very hard thing to explain to people that you'd be interested in dating." | United States |
| Dovydas | Slow | Kęstutis Cicėnas | 2023 | The film is about the romantic relationship between an asexual man and an allosexual woman. | Lithuania |
| Gareth | The Artifice Girl | Franklin Ritch | 2022 | The main protagonist mentions that he is asexual. This is not central to the plot. | United States |
| Rönkkö | Girl Picture | Eleonoora Kauhanen | 2022 | Rönkkö has sex several times over the course of the film, but admits at the end that she is unable to enjoy it. In an interview, Kauhanen said that although her character's sexuality is not explicitly stated in the film, she could be asexual or demisexual. | Finland |
| Seligman | Nymphomaniac | Stellan Skarsgård | 2013 | Seligman confirms his asexuality and virginity to Joe, but assures her his "innocence" and lack of bias makes him the best man to listen to her story. However, many believe that he was lying, as he attempts to rape Joe later in the film. | Denmark, Germany, France, Belgium |
| Kasumi 'Sobakasu' Sobata | I Am What I Am | Toko Miura | 2022 | The film is about Sobata's life within amatonormativity. | Japan |
| Star | Queens of the Qing Dynasty | Sarah Walker | 2022 | Star explicitly states in the film that she is asexual. Ashley McKenzie, the film's director, said in an interview that watching the film after production was completed helped her realize that she was also on the asexual spectrum. | United States |
| Selah Summers | Selah and the Spades | Lovie Simone | 2019 | Selah is the leader of a drug-dealing faction of students at her elite boarding school, and attempts to manipulate a new student named Paloma into becoming the faction's new leader when Selah graduates. When asked whether Selah and Paloma had a romantic relationship, Tayarisha Poe, writer and director of the film, stated that "I think Selah is asexual, but she doesn't have the words for it, which happens... Selah will never love [Paloma] the way she wants her to, but she will use Paloma's love to get what she wants, every single time." | United States |
| Todd | Straight Up | James Sweeney | 2019 | Sweeney, writer and director of the film, stated "while personally I do see Todd as on the ace spectrum, I don't know when another label is in the cards for him—and it was important to me to end Todd's arc with a departure, instead of a destination". | United States |

== Literature ==
| Characters | Work | Author | Years | Description |
|---|---|---|---|---|
| Tori Beaugrand | Quicksilver | R. J. Anderson | 2013 | Tori, an engineer, hacker, and friend, is asexual, an important part of her life, as she mediates on an attempt to have a sexual relationship. Her friend Milo wants their relationship to be sexual but he respects the sexual orientation of Tori. In a post on LiveJournal, the author explained how Tori being asexual "adds a layer of complication and delicacy to her relationships with her parents and her best (male) friend," Milo, while explaining some of her choices. |
| Clariel | Clariel | Garth Nix | 2014 | The protagonist "stands out for her assured asexuality", does not see the appeal of sex, and wants to live alone in the woods as a forest ranger. Clariel's lack of experience of sexual or romantic attraction are described at multiple points, come up early in the book, and are treated as a core part of who she is as a person. |
| Corey | Before I Let Go | Marieke Nijkamp | 2019 | This book features an asexual protagonist, Corey, whose asexuality is integral to the story, which her editor was ok with. Some have described this book as a gripping "asexual tale of friendship and love." |
| Ellis | Loveless | Alice Oseman | 2020 | Georgia's older cousin, who is also asexual. Like Sunil, Ellis' character acts as medium, in the story, "for the reader to understand asexuality." |
| Hippolytus | Hippolytus | Euripides | 428 BC | The character's vow of chastity in honor of the goddess Artemis has led to modern interpretations of the character as an asexual. |
| Kerewin Holmes | The Bone People | Keri Hulme | 1984 | Although she does not use the word 'asexual', the way she describes her sexuality aligns with modern understandings of asexuality. |
| Sherlock Holmes | A Study In Scarlet | Arthur Conan Doyle | 1887 | Sir Arthur Conan Doyle intentionally portrayed the character of Holmes as what would today be characterized as asexual with the intention to portray him as solely driven by intellect and immune to the desires of the flesh. |
| Firuz-e Jafari | The Bruising of Qilwa | Naseem Jamnia | 2022 | Firuz-e is aromantic and asexual, or "aroace", in addition to being non-binary. |
| Sunil Jha | Loveless | Alice Oseman | 2020 | He is Georgia Warr's college mentor and is gay and asexual. He has a conversation, at one point, with Georgia about asexuality. |
| Alice Johnston | Let's Talk About Love | Claire Kann | 2018 | The protagonist is a biromantic asexual woman who enters a romantic relationship with a boy after her previous girlfriend broke up with. |
| Neil Abram Josten | All For The Game series | Nora Sakavic | 2013–present | Neil is demisexual. When asked by his teammates, "which way he swings," he answers that he doesn't swing at all. He grows closer to one of his teammates throughout the books, becoming aware of his own attraction toward him when confessed to. He's not attracted to any other men, or women. |
| Ekundayo Kunleo | Raybearer | Jordan Ifueko | 2020 | Ekundayo is biromantic and asexual, stating that while he has crushes, he has "never been interested in the sex part." |
| Felicity Montague | Montague Siblings trilogy (Note: The books in this series are: The Gentleman's Guide to Vice and Virtue (2017), The Lady's Guide to Petticoats and Piracy (2018), The Gentleman's Guide to Getting Lucky (2019), and The Nobleman's Guide to Scandal and Shipwrecks (2020).) | Mackenzi Lee | 2017–2020 | Though the word is never used due to the time period, Felicity's descriptions of her sexuality clearly line up with that associated with asexuality. |
| Andrew Perrault | Don't Let the Forest In | CG Drews | 2024 | The book's protagonist, he is an asexual boy who is romantically attracted to his roommate Thomas. |
| Reyna Avila Ramírez-Arellano | The Heroes of Olympus and The Trials of Apollo series | Rick Riordan | 2011–2020 | In The Trials of Apollo, Reyna tells the Greek god Apollo she is uninterested in a relationship with him, even if he had his godly good looks (implying a lack of physical attraction). Reyna was later confirmed to be an alloromantic asexual in a tweet by Rick Riordan (which was subsequently deleted upon his leaving Twitter). |
| Rumi Seto | Summer Bird Blue | Akemi Dawn Bowman | 2018 | This novel features an asexual protagonist, Rumi Seto, whose asexuality is merely an aspect of her character and not the main focus of the story, as on being sent to live with her aunt in Hawaii following the tragic death of his sister, she begins to realize life is still worth living, even in the midst of grief. |
| The Astronauts | To Be Taught, if Fortunate | Becky Chambers | 2019 | This novella features multiple ace-spec characters. |
| Victor Vale | Villains Series | V. E. Schwab | 2013 | Victor Vale is one of the main viewpoint characters in the Villains series his sexuality is only mentioned once in the second book Vengeful where it's noted he has never had an interest in sex. His asexuality was later confirmed in a tweet by the author. |
| Various | Being Ace | Madeline Dyer (editor), various | 2023 | The book is a short story anthology focused on asexual characters. |
| Georgia Warr | Loveless | Alice Oseman | 2020 | Georgia is the main character of Loveless, coming to terms with her sexuality during the events of the book, realizing that she is an aromantic asexual. She has an asexual friends: her college mentor Sunil Jha and her cousin Ellis. |
| Nancy Whitman | Wayward Children series | Seanan McGuire | 2016-Present | The protagonist of Every Heart a Doorway and Through Gates of Garnet and Gold, Nancy uses the word "asexual" to describe herself and defines the term for the other characters. |
| Tash Zelenka | Tash Hearts Tolstoy | Kathryn Ormsbee | 2017 | The book's protagonist, she identifies as "romantic asexual," with her fears over coming out as asexual to her crush Thom being a plot point. |

== Live-action television ==
| Character | Portrayed by | Program | Years | Notes |
|---|---|---|---|---|
| Kryten 2X4B 523P | David Ross (series 2) & Robert Llewellyn (series 3-12) | Red Dwarf | 1988-2020 | In the series 6 premier episode 'Psirens', Kryten says "I am unseducable in that I have no desires or lusts." furthermore throughout the show he is blissfully ignorant of the meaning behind sexual innuendo made by the other characters. And in the series 8 episode 'Back in the Red: Part 2' we find out that he lacks sexual organs, and when asked about it he replies "Why would I need one?". is made clear however that Kryten feels romantic attraction, when in the episode 'Camille' he experiences "advanced mutual compatibility on the basis of a primary initial ident" (Or what Humans call, love at first sight) with a Genetically Engineered Life Form called Camille, with whom he goes on to form a romantic relationship lasting one episode. Therefore implying (while not said explicitly) that he is Asexual and Alloromantic. |
| Asexual couple | (Unidentified) | House | 2012 | In the "Better Half" episode, Dr. Wilson meets an asexual couple, but it is later revealed that the wife was faking asexuality for the "sake of her husband" while the husband had a blockage in his brain suppressing his sex drive. The founder of the Asexual Visibility and Education Network, David Jay, criticized the representation, calling it "disturbing but not unexpected," while others, in a petition to FOX executives, wrote that the episode encourages viewers to see asexuality skeptically, rather than accept it, "to probe asexual people for causes of our 'condition' rather than to accept us as a part of the natural spectrum of human sexual diversity." |
| Brad | Sidney Franklin | Faking It | 2014–2016 | Brad only briefly exclaims his orientation in an episode about labels. |
| Caíque (Carlos Henrique Junqueira) | Thiago Fragoso | Travessia | 2022–2023 | Caíque is described as asexual. He does not feel sexual desire for anyone, but may be interested in romantic relationships. |
| Breanna Casey | Aleyse Shannon | Leverage: Redemption | 2021-2025 | Breanna is a hacker with an asexual pride sticker on her laptop. |
| Esperanza "Spooner" Cruz | Lisseth Chavez | Legends of Tomorrow | 2021–2022 | In the episode "The Fixed Point" (2022), Spooner realizes she is asexual and comes out to Zari Tarazi; she is the first Arrowverse character to do so. |
| Misty Day | Lily Rabe | American Horror Story | 2011–present | Misty Day is a powerful witch that has the power to bring things back to life. In an interview with Entertainment Weekly, showrunner Ryan Murphy stated that he thinks that Misty is "just an asexual character". |
| Daryl Dixon | Norman Reedus | The Walking Dead, The Walking Dead: Daryl Dixon | 2010–present | According to the show's creator Robert Kirkman, Dixon is "somewhat asexual." |
| Drea | Lillian Carrier | Everything's Gonna Be Okay | 2020-2021 | Drea is homoromantic asexual. |
| Valentina "Voodoo" Dunacci | Kelly O'Sullivan | Sirens | 2014–2015 | She was the "focus of a major storyline" where she has a strong bond with Brian, who is not "asexual but is hopelessly in love with Val." Even though Brian says she is his girlfriend, Valentina does not accept this officially. (The show was "willing to live in a gray area instead of forcing Val to change." As such, the series has been accused of treating her orientation as a "joke or as an obstacle"; while the character has won praise from others for being more than her sexuality.) |
| Dr. Melissa 'Mel' King | Taylor Dearden | The Pitt | 2025–present | Dearden confirmed in a 2025 interview that Mel King is asexual. |
| Evan | Avery Monsen | High Maintenance | 2012-2020 | Evan, one of The Guy's clients, is asexual. |
| Liv Flaherty | Isobel Steele | Emmerdale | 2016–2022 | Liv has no attraction to men or women. (This is the second time that there has been an "asexuality storyline" in a soap opera.) |
| Guto (Augusto do Nascimento) | Daniel Rangel | Família é Tudo | 2024 | Guto is a shy and nerdy young man who works as an intern at the Mancini Music record label. Guto is Chicão's brother and falls in love with Lupita, a Guatemalan woman who initially only has eyes for Jupiter. His shyness and virginity are recurring themes in the plot, leading him to several embarrassing and comedic situations. He faces personal and professional challenges, trying to overcome his shyness and earn his place at the record label, in addition to dealing with his feelings for Lupita and Mila. Guto self-described as demisexual during the show. |
| Isaac Henderson | Tobie Donovan | Heartstopper | 2022–present | Isaac is a featured character of the show adaptation of the graphic novel Heartstopper. In season two of the show, released August 2023, Isaac is introduced to James; an openly gay student at his school. While James clearly expresses his crush on him, it is clear Isaac struggles to understand why he cannot reciprocate James' feelings. Isaac discovers the terminology 'aromantic asexual' at a queer art exhibition and after further personal reading and research. He eventually comes to terms with being aro-ace as he enters his school library and proudly takes Ace: What Asexuality Reveals About Desire, Society, and the Meaning of Sex, a book on asexuality by Angela Chen. Previous to season two's release, Heartstopper creator Alice Oseman confirmed on Twitter that Isaac is aromantic asexual. |
| Jay | Esco Jouley | State of the Union | 2022–present | Jay is asexual. |
| Yako Kaname | Tomosaka Rie | She Loves to Cook, and She Loves to Eat | 2022–2024 | Yako is an asexual lesbian. She educates protagonist Nomoto on the nuances in asexual/aromantic spectrums, helping Nomoto come to terms with her own lesbian identity. |
| Sakuko Kodama | Yukino Kishii | Koisenu Futari | 2022 | This series revolves around Kodama and Takahashi's developing relationship, after Kodama realizes she is aromantic-asexual by reading Takahashi's blog. Co-director Yuta Oshida came up with the idea for the story after coming to the realization that Japanese television dramas often include romantic relationships and elements, and he later learned about asexuality, with his research including interviewing asexual people. |
| Greta Moreno | Haley Sanchez | Genera+ion | 2021 | Greta is homoromantic asexual. |
| Sarah "O" Owens | Thaddea Graham | Sex Education | 2023 | O is introduced as a rival sex therapist to Otis in season 4. She comes out as asexual in episode 5. The character was developed with the guidance of asexual activist Yasmin Benoit. |
| Douglas "Ca$h" Piggott | Will McDonald | Heartbreak High | 2022–present | Though Douglas never uses the word asexual, his feelings towards sex imply that he is on the asexuality spectrum. He explains that he isn't interested in having sex with anyone. |
| Poliana (Audálio Candeias) | Matheus Nachtergaele | Vale Tudo | 2025 | Poliana reveals to his sister, Aldeíde, that he is asexual. During a heartfelt scene, Poliana admits he doesn't like kissing or sex, and Aldeíde initially wonders if it's pathological. Poliana, a warm, optimistic character running a bar in Rio, was originally written as heterosexual in the 1988 version. |
| Poppy | Zoe Jarman | Huge | 2010 | She is an ever-cheerful, fairy-like counselor, often very supportive and protective of both the girls she watches over. In episode 5 of season 1, Poppy comes out as asexual while watching a movie, stating she "kept waiting to feel the feelings that everyone else talked about, but [she] just never got there." |
| Purvis | Joshua Jackson | Unbreakable Kimmy Schmidt | 2016 | He is a convenience store owner and Dawson's Creek fan resembling Pacey Witter who takes it upon himself to explain the ins and outs of virginity loss to Kimmy Schmidt and Dong, before revealing he dislikes the concept of sex and does not intend to ever have it himself. |
| Rudá Sampaio | Guilherme Cabral | Travessia | 2022-2023 | Rudá is young man who is in tune with the digital world and the son of Guida, played by Alessandra Negrini, from her first marriage. Rudá has a strong connection with his aunt, Leonor, but has little contact with his mother and, especially, with his stepfather, Moretti. Rudá is described as strictly asexual, which means he does not feel sexual attraction to anyone, regardless of gender. Rudá gets involved in complicated situations, such as the creation of a deepfake that drastically changes the life of the protagonist, Brisa. |
| Raphael Santiago | David Castro | Shadowhunters | 2016–2019 | Raphael came out as asexual in the last episode of season 2. |
| Sebastian, the Asexual Icon | Craig Kilborn | The Late Late Show | 2003–2004 | Though he was possibly the first depiction of an asexual character on television in 2003 (during Kilborn's tenure as host), Vox highlights that "the character made it obvious the writers had no idea asexuality was a real orientation, turning the very idea of being nonsexual into a punchline". |
| Florence Simmons | Mirren Mack | Sex Education | 2020 | Florence comes to Otis for advice in season 2. She tells him she has no interest in sex. Finding his answers lacking however, she later goes to see his mother Jean, who helps her understand that she is asexual, though not aromantic. |
| Abbi Singh | Rhianna Jagpal | The Imperfects | 2022 | In the first episode, Abbi talks to her friends about the fact that she's a succubus. She mentions that she has complicated feelings about it because she's asexual. Abbi is later revealed to be romantically attracted to women. |
| Satoru Takahashi | Issei Takahashi | Koisenu Futari | 2022 | Like Sakuko Kodama, Takahashi is also aromantic asexual. |
| Gerald Tippett | Harry McNaughton | Shortland Street | 2007–2012 | Introduced in 2007, Vox identified Gerald as the first "sincere" asexual character on television. Gerald's sexuality was discovered and explored over the course of several episodes. |
| Hara Tsumugi | Tanabe Ririka | 17.3 About a Sex | 2020 | In episode 2, Tsumugi tells her friends that she is likely Asexual Aromantic. She comes into her identity throughout the series, later coming out to her father in episode 7. |
| Varys | Conleth Hill | Game of Thrones | 2011–2019 | Lord Varys is a eunuch, but he states his asexuality predated his castration. Other eunuchs in the series are sexually active. |
| Adrian Veidt | Jeremy Irons | Watchmen | 2019 | He was described as asexual by showrunner Damon Lindelof. Also known as Ozymandias. |
| Will | Noah Thomas | Everything Now | 2023 | While initially saying that he's had sex, we later figure out that hasn't, with him saying, “I'm starting to realise I need a connection first, looks don't really do it for me on their own.” This alludes to his demisexuality. |

== Video games ==
| Characters | Series or Title | Year | Notes | Developer |
|---|---|---|---|---|
| Alter | Apex Legends | 2019 | Alter (voiced by Crystal Yu) was added as a playable character in 2024. While not elaborated in-game, the character's writer confirmed that Alter is asexual. | Respawn Entertainment |
| Ayano Aishi | Yandere Simulator | 2014–present | In October 2024, YandereDev confirmed protagonist Ayano Aishi to be an asexual uniromantic, who "doesn't feel sexual attraction [and is] exclusively attracted [romantically] to one specific human being in all the world, regardless of that person's gender". | YandereDev |
| Parvati Holcomb | The Outer Worlds | 2019 | Companion character who expresses professional and later romantic interest in the Chief engineer of the Colony Ship "Ground Breaker", Junlei, and is an asexual homoromantic. Narrative designer Kate Dollarhyde, an asexual woman who is also biromantic, was excited they were inheriting this character, saying she was glad to "bring that personal experience to the audience," making her character different from other companions. | Obsidian Entertainment |
| Maya | Borderlands 2 | 2012 | Maya (voiced by Martha Harms)—described as asexual and romantically attracted in Kreig (while knowing nothing about romance). | Gearbox Software |
| Stardust | Sucker for Love: Date to Die For | 2024 | The protagonist, Stardust, is an asexual lesbian dating a goddess of lust and fertility. | Akabaka |
| Siffrin | In Stars And Time | 2023 | Within the game, Siffrin goes on 'friendship quests' where they learn more about their party members. When he is on Mirabelle's, they discuss her being aroace and Siffrin confesses that "Well, I don't know about the romantic part... But I don't want to 'do things' with people, either." Additionally, they are confirmed as ace outside of the game by the developer several times. Their particular feelings on sex itself however is left up to interpretation with Insertdisc5 stating that all viewings are correct. | Insertdisc5 |

== Comics, manga, and graphic novels ==
| Characters | Title | Years | Notes | Country |
|---|---|---|---|---|
| Alix | Sex Criminals | 2013–present | Alix is an asexual character introduced in issue #13. The story covers her experiences as a teenager feeling pressured to have sex, and how she feels alien without coming across as broken. While other characters in the story are able to freeze time when they orgasm, Alix freezes time through the adrenaline rush of BASE jumping. | United States |
| Amiru | Last Gender: When We Are Nameless | 2022 | She has a sex drive but is not romantically attracted to anyone else, and pushes to make herself "the main character in her own life." | Japan |
| Brainiac 5 | DC Comics | 1961–present | Brainiac 5 is a time-traveling alien from the 31st century and a member of the Legion of Super-Heroes. Across iterations, he is often romantically involved with Supergirl. In DC Pride (2022), Brainiac 5 was revealed to be demisexual. | United States |
| Chika | Is Love the Answer? | 2023 | She detests romance, having sex, or kissing other people, and her professor tells her she is on the asexual spectrum, resulting in her "intensely researching the subject of human sexuality and asexuality" in an effort to understand herself and what other people experience. She is also aromantic. | Japan |
| Diane | Lumberjanes | 2014–present | In issue #68, when Hes confesses her love for Diane, Diane says: "...I like you too. But I don't have any interest in kissing or junk like that" and has never had interest in kissing anyone. On the following page, she still says she has romantic feelings toward Hes, but not sexual ones. | United States |
| Nadia Van Dyne / The Wasp | Marvel Comics | 2016–present | During writer Jeremy Whitley's run on The Unstoppable Wasp (2017), Nadia was implied to be asexual, which was continued in later series such as Unstoppable Wasp: Built on Hope and Marvel Action: Chillers #3. Whitley clarified in 2021 while he views the character as aromantic asexual, he and editor Alanna Smith were prevented from outright stating that during their run due to corporate concerns from the MCU franchise. In 2023's Marvel's Voices: Pride, Nadia is considered by Gwenpool to join her "Ace Force"; consequently, Whitley then confirmed Nadia was now considered "officially Ace" by Marvel editorial. | United States |
| Jughead Jones | Archie | 1942–present | In Jughead #4 in 2016, a comic by Chip Zdarsky and Erica Henderson, Jughead was established as an asexual character, with Zdarsky saying at the 2015 New York Comic Con that historically Jughead "has been portrayed as asexual. They just didn't have a label for it, so they just called him a woman-hater," even though he isn't a misogynist. Zdarsky added that "asexuality is underrepresented," noting that since he is already asexual, he would "continue to write him that way," and said it is more interesting than "writing him as just being behind everyone developmentally." | United States |
| Raphael Santiago | The Shadowhunter Chronicles | 2007–present | In The Red Scrolls of Magic, a fey woman asks Raphael about his sexuality. He responds and says his sexuality is "not interested." Author Cassandra Clare confirmed his asexuality, but has rarely spoken about the subject. | United States |
| Tori Spring | Heartstopper | 2014–present | In the comic, Tori comes out as asexual to her brother Charlie Spring. | United Kingdom |
| Connor Hawke | DC Comics | 1994–present | The DC Pride 2022 anthology confirms Connor to be asexual; "Connor is a character who a number of fans have interpreted to be asexual for decades, as he has often shied away from sexual moments or innuendos". The debut story, titled "Think of Me", was produced by an entirely-asexual team consisting of Ro Stein, Ted Brandt, and Frank Cvetkovic. | United States |
| Kashikawa | Sex Ed 120% | 2020–2021 | She is a student who is not interested in romance or sex, and loves animals. | Japan |
| Mine | Mine-kun is Asexual | 2023 | A man who dislikes sexual intimacy in relationships and dislikes kissing. He is loved by Murai, even though her romantic feelings are not reciprocated. | Japan |
| Gwendolyn "Gwen" Poole | Marvel Comics | 2015–present | During writer Kelly Thompson's run on West Coast Avengers (2018), Gwen entered into a romantic relationship with Quentin Quire, however, Gwen later admits that she only did so because she felt that a romantic plot would make her less of a supporting character in the metafictional narrative of the series and thus less likely to die. In 2023, it was then confirmed that Gwen was the QPR-seeking variety of asexual and aromantic during a story arc in the Love Unlimited series. During this arc, she is in a relationship with Julie Power and discovers what it means to be asexual after Julie tells her that she probably is, while still delving into the kind of life partner she would want to have. In 2023's Marvel's Voices: Pride, Gwen then attempts to form an "Ace Force" with other asexual characters, while also sending a message to any "ace kid" reading that "you are not alone". | United States |
| Gaveedra-Seven / Shatterstar | Marvel Comics | 1991–2007 | Shatterstar's co-creators Rob Liefeld and Fabian Nicieza created and wrote the character as being asexual from 1991 to 2007, expressing disapproval of later writers ignoring this aspect of his character, Liefeld saying that Shatterstar was meant to be "asexual, and struggling to understand human behavior", and Nicieza stating that "In my final issue, I pretty clearly stated that Shatterstar had no real understanding of sexuality – homo or hetero – and needed to learn about general human nature before he could define his own sexual identity." Following the duo's departure, Shatterstar and Rictor's relationship was written as romantic from 2007 onward, against their wishes, with Marvel editor-in-chief Joe Quesada stating that if Liefeld wanted the character's asexuality restored, he would have to "take it up with the next editor-in-chief", to which Liefeld stated that he "can't wait to someday" do. Following Quesada's departure from Marvel in May 2022, whether the character's asexuality will be restored is unconfirmed. | United States |
| Someone-san | Our Dreams at Dusk | 2015–2018 | A mysterious and secretive person who owns the drop-in center. They are later revealed to be asexual and non-binary in volume 4 of the manga. | Japan |
| The Truth | Marvel Comics | 2017–present | Introduced in Max Bemis' Marvel Legacy soft reboot of Moon Knight (2017), the Truth is identified as asexual on-panel by his psychologist, reviewing his medical records. In 2023's Marvel's Voices: Pride, the Truth is considered by Gwen Poole to join her "Ace Force". | United States |
| Asahi Sato | Doughnuts Under a Crescent Moon | 2019–2022 | Hinako and Sato are asexual lesbians who fall in love with one another. | Japan |
| Uno Hinako | Doughnuts Under a Crescent Moon | 2019–2022 | Hinako and Sato are asexual lesbians who fall in love with one another. | Japan |
| Nora Chestnut | And Another Lovely Day | 2024–present | Nora is a history teacher at a high school. The webtoon 'And Another Lovely Day' focuses upon her relationship with Elliott, with the two meeting during an event and mistakenly assuming the other has a crush on them, trying their best to shut that down with completely contrasting methods. The series explores their lives and experiences with being aroace and what it means to be aroace as an adult. The summary of the series explicitly confirms them both to be aromantic asexual. | |
| Elliott Lam | And Another Lovely Day | 2024–present | Elliott is an english teacher at the same high school as Nora. The webtoon 'And Another Lovely Day' focuses upon his relationship with Nora, with the two meeting during an event and mistakenly assuming the other has a crush on them, trying their best to shut that down with completely contrasting methods. The series explores their lives and experiences with being aroace and what it means to be aroace as an adult. The summary of the series explicitly confirms them both to be aromantic asexual. | |
| Yuriko | I Want To Be a Wall | 2020-2023 | Yuriko is an aromantic asexual woman who is married to Gakurouta, a closeted gay man. | Japan |

== Radio, audio drama, and fictional podcasts ==
| Characters | Title | Years | Notes | Country |
|---|---|---|---|---|
| Hampton Fawx | Fawx & Stallion | 2022–present | Hampton Fawx was confirmed to be aromantic and asexual in a behind the scenes episode by the creators. | United States |
| Zolf Smith | Rusty Quill Gaming | 2015-2022 | In a note at the beginning of episode 176, Ben Meredith confirms that Zolf identifies as bi-romantic grey-asexual. | United Kingdom |
| Sir Fitzroy Maplecourt | The Adventure Zone:Graduation | 2019-2021 | Griffin McElroy, the player behind the character Sir Fitzroy Maplecourt, confirmed that Fitzroy was intended to be asexual. | United States |
| Jonathan Sims/The Archivist | The Magnus Archives | 2016-2021 | Jonathan Sims was confirmed asexual by the character's creator. | United Kingdom |
| Arkady Patel | The Strange Case of Starship Iris | 2016–present | Arkady was first confirmed to be grey-ace by the creator of the show, then later stated in a season two episode. | United States |
| Jet Sikuliaq | The Penumbra Podcast | 2016-2024 | In Season 3, Episode 2, Juno Steel and the Tools of Rust Part 2, Jet says "I do not experience romantic or sexual attraction for Rita or anybody else. And I never have." | United States |
| Riz Gukgak | Fantasy High (Dimension 20) | 2018-2025 | Riz Gukgak was confirmed asexual by dungeon master Brennan Lee Mulligan. Beyond that, he has never displayed any sexual or romantic attraction or desires in the series, stating that it's normal for people to 'hook up' but that he's "not super into that". | United States |
| Liam Wilhemina | A Crown of Candy (Dimension 20) | 2020 | Liam is an alloace character that explicitly states that he is asexual but not aromantic within the episode "The Two Balls". He eventually enters into a political marriage in which no sex is a stated requirement. | United States |
| Caduceus Clay | Critical Role | 2018-2021 | Caduceus Clay is a character from the actual play show Critical Role, showing up in Campaign two (The Mighty Nein). Within episode 114 he expresses outright that he is 'not into anybody' after being flirted with. The player that created him confirmed him as asexual and has also stated that he is aromantic with 'no romantic interest'. | United States |

== See also ==
- List of fictional aromantic characters
- Timeline of asexual history
- List of animated series with LGBT characters
- List of comedy television series with LGBT characters
- List of dramatic television series with LGBT characters: 1960s–2000s
- List of dramatic television series with LGBT characters: 2010–2015
- List of dramatic television series with LGBT characters: 2016–2019
- LGBTQ themes in Western animation
- LGBTQ themes in anime and manga
