= Timeline of asexual history =

This is a timeline of asexual history worldwide. The briefness of this timeline can be attributed to the fact that acceptance of asexuality as a sexual orientation and field of scientific research is still relatively new.

Several of these events refer to historical essays and studies on sexual behaviour. While the modern discussion of asexuality focuses on lack of sexual attraction, rather than celibacy or sexual abstinence, the research on human sexuality and sexual orientation has only recently started making said distinction.

== Roman Empire ==
An explicitly asexual character appears in the Greek-language dialogue Amores (Lucian), tentatively attributed to the satirist Lucian. The story uses a frame narrative, being a conversation between two men, Lycinius and Theomnestus. Theomnestus asks Lycinius to judge between the love of women and the love of boys. Theomnestus describes himself as being "smitten by both passions", his feelings hanging "like an accurate balance with both scales in equipoise." He trusts Lycinius as a judge in this matter because, in his words, "I can see you incline to neither type of passion."

== 19th century ==
=== 1860s ===
- 1869: Karl-Maria Kertbeny, in the same pamphlets arguing against Prussian sodomy law where he coined the terms "homosexual" and "heterosexual", also used the word "monosexuals" to refer to people who only masturbate.

=== 1880s ===
- 1884: American sexologist William Alexander Hammond published Sexual Impotence in the Male, where he wrote about two male patients he had consulted as early as 1860 who appeared physically healthy yet did not experience sexual desire. He referred to this condition as "original absence of all sexual desire." In 1887, Hammond also published the cases of two women who experienced no sexual desire without perceptible cause.

=== 1890s ===
- 1896: German sexologist Magnus Hirschfeld wrote the pamphlet Sappho und Sokrates, which mentions people without any sexual desire and links them to the concept of "anesthesia sexual".
- 1897: German sexual reformist Emma Trosse gave the first definition of asexuality in her work Ein Weib? Psychologisch-biographische: Studie über eine Konträrsexuelle (A woman? Psychological-biographical study of a contrary-sexual) under the term Sinnlichkeitslosigkeit ('Asensuality') and counted herself as such, stating "Verfasser hat den Mut, sich zu jener Kategorie zu bekennen" ('Author has the courage to admit to this category.')

== 20th century ==
=== 1900s ===
- 1907: Reverend Carl Schlegel, a German immigrant living in New Orleans, was found guilty by the city Presbytery on charges of "homosexualism, Sodomy, or Uranism." Schlegel was quoted as advocating for "the same laws" for "homosexuals, heterosexuals, bisexuals [and] asexuals."

=== 1920s ===
- 1922: Jennie June, an American author on sexual and gender nonconformity, wrote "The Female Impersonators." In it, June describes people known as "anaphrodites," people who do not experience sexual attraction. Says June: "their minds are devoid of hero-worship and they shudder violently at the very thought of any kind of association grounded on sex differences. Their anaphroditism is either an after-effect of an illness in childhood or congenital." June also mentions that "Sir Isaac Newton and Immanuel Kant appear to have been anaphrodites."

=== 1940s ===
- 1948: The Kinsey Scale included the category "X" for males who reported no socio-sexual contacts or reactions; according to the research, 1.5% of adult male subjects fell into this category.

=== 1950s ===
- 1953: The Kinsey Scale included the category "X" for females who reported no socio-sexual contacts or reactions; according to the research, 19% of female interviewees fell into this category.

=== 1960s ===
- 1969: Anton Szandor LaVey in his book The Satanic Bible referenced asexuals and asexuality, stating that "Satanism condones any type of sexual activity which properly satisfies your individual desires – be it heterosexual, homosexual, bisexual, or even asexual".

=== 1970s ===
- 1972: Lisa Orlando, on behalf of the Asexual Caucus of the New York Radical Feminists, published The Asexual Manifesto, describing an asexual person as someone "relating sexually to no one" and asexuality a philosophy in which sex is rejected unless it is both "congruent with our values and totally incidental and unimportant to our relationships". The article further outlines particular harmful myths associated with the importance of sex in relationships, broadly aligned with the concepts of amatonormativity and compulsory sexuality.
- 1973: Activists at Barnard College were pictured to include "asexual" on a board advocating to "choose your own label" and had their picture featured in February/March 1973 edition of Off Our Backs. The picture was intended to be released in the previous article which described asexuality to be "an orientation that regards a partner as nonessential to sex, and sex as nonessential to a satisfying relationship."
- 1974: Singer and composer David Bowie discussed asexuality in Rolling Stone in the article "David Bowie in conversation on sexuality with William S. Burroughs.
- 1977: Myra Johnson wrote one of the first academic papers about asexuality as part of the book The Sexually Oppressed. She described "asexuality" as a complete lack of sexual desire, while those who do experience sexual desire but have no wish to satisfy it with others were labeled as "autoerotic". Johnson focused on the problems experiences by such women, who she felt were often ignored by the sexual revolution and feminist movements of the time.
- 1979: In a study published in Advances in the Study of Affect, Michael D. Storms reimagined the Kinsey Scale as a two-dimensional map which included asexuality, defined as exhibiting little to no homo-eroticism nor hetero-eroticism. This type of scale accounted for asexuality for the first time. Storms conjectured that many researchers following Kinsey's model could be mis-categorizing asexual subjects as bisexual, because both were simply defined by a lack of preference for gender in sexual partners.

=== 1980s ===
- 1980: Publication of the DSM-III, which was the first version of the DSM to include a disorder relating to low sexual desire. This category was initially called Inhibited Sexual Desire (ISD) and later subdivided into Hypoactive Sexual Desire Disorder (HSDD) and Sexual Aversion Disorder (SAD) in the revision published in 1987 (DSM-III-R), the former relating to a lack of interest in sex and the latter a phobic avoidance.
- 1983: The first study that gave empirical data about asexuals was published in 1983 by Paula Nurius, concerning the relationship between sexual orientation and mental health. The study used a variant of Kinsey's model, and scored participants according to sexual behaviour and desire for it.
- 1989: American talk show host Sally Jesse Raphael interviewed Toby (alias of Jim Sinclair), a then self-described androgynous and nonsexual person.

=== 1990s ===
- 1993: The book Boston Marriages: Romantic but Asexual Relationships Among Contemporary Lesbians by Esther D. Rothblum and Kathleen A. Brehony was released.
- 1994: Anthony Bogaert, conducted a study published in The Journal of Sex Research that concluded that 1 in 100 persons identified as asexual.
- 1997: Activist Jim Sinclair posted in their website the essay Personal Definitions of Sexuality, originally written in response to a class assignment in 1987, where they defined themself as asexual.
- 1997: Zoe O'Reilly published the article My life as an amoeba in the StarNet Dispatches webzine, a first-person exploration of asexuality that sparked responses through the late 90s and early 2000s by people who identified with it.

== 21st century ==
=== 2000s ===
- 2001: David Jay founded the Asexual Visibility and Education Network (AVEN), which became the most prolific and well-known of the various asexual communities that started to form since the advent of the World Wide Web and social media.
- 2002: New York passed the Sexual Orientation Non-Discrimination Act, which was the first, and is currently (April 2020) the only piece of legislation that mentions asexuality in the world.
- 2004: Psychologist Anthony F. Bogaert published "Asexuality: prevalence and associated factors in a national probability sample" in the Journal of Sex Research. According to this paper, 1% of a 1994 British probability sample indicated feeling no attraction for males nor females.
- 2004: The New Scientist dedicated an issue to asexuality in response to Bogaert's paper.
- 2004: Discovery dedicated an episode of The Sex Files to asexuality.
- 2005: In June 2005, the common symbol for the asexual community of a black ring worn on the middle finger of the right hand started in a forum thread on AVEN. The material and exact design of the ring are not important as long as it is primarily black.
- 2005: Stephen Hillenburg revealed that SpongeBob SquarePants is asexual.
- 2006: In January, David Jay appeared on ABC's The View and later in March of that year, he appeared on MSNBC's Tucker program, hosted by Tucker Carlson. On both programs he discussed asexuality.
- 2009: AVEN members participated in the first asexual entry into an American pride parade when they walked in the San Francisco Pride Parade.

=== 2010s ===
The asexual pride flag was introduced in 2010, containing four horizontal stripes of black, gray, white, and purple

- 2010: The asexual pride flag was introduced to the public. The asexual pride flag consists of four horizontal stripes: black, grey, white, and purple from top to bottom.
- 2010: Asexual Awareness Week, now called Ace Week, was founded by Sara Beth Brooks in 2010. It occurs in the later half of October, and was created to both celebrate asexuals, demisexuals, and greysexuals and promote awareness.
- 2012: The first International Asexual Conference was held at the 2012 World Pride in London.
- 2013: The Diagnostic and Statistical Manual of Mental Disorders, Fifth Edition changed the diagnosis of hypoactive sexual desire disorder conditions to include an exception for people who self-identify as asexual.
- 2014: Dr. Pragati Singh, a greysexual (a sexual orientation similar to asexuality), launched a Facebook Group called "Indian Aces" for Indian asexuals.
- 2015: George Norman became Britain's first openly asexual local election candidate.
- 2015: Dr. Pragati Singh launched Platonicity, an asexual dating platform. Platonicity utilized Google Forms, in which users would enter their information, and Singh would match respondents manually. Singh closed Platonicity in 2016, after being overwhelmed with the amount of data.
- 2016: Joe Parrish became the United States's first openly asexual state election candidate.
- 2016: The literary journal Aze is launched, created by Michael Paramo to publish the poetry, artwork, and personal and academic essays of asexual, aromantic, and agender people.
- 2017: Nabil Allal and Alaa Yassine launched the "Asexuality in Arabic" social media groups.
- 2017: The podcast "Sounds Fake But Okay" is launched, hosted by Sarah Costello and Kayla Kaszyca. Costello "identifies as aro ace", while Kaszyca identifies as "demisexual and straight".
- 2018: An episode of the series The Sex Map of Britain on BBC Three was dedicated to asexuality, entitled I Don't Want Sex.
- 2019: Then 18-year-old Emi Salida, a British YouTuber who identifies as asexual, appeared in a Sky News documentary on asexuality.
- 2019: British soap opera Emmerdale featured its first asexual character when Liv Flaherty, played by actress Isobel Steele, came out as asexual.
- 2019: Bradford, England author Elizabeth Hopkinson, a romantic asexual, began rewriting classic fairy tales with asexual twists.
- 2019: In an issue of Attitude titled "The Activists", Yasmin Benoit became the first openly asexual woman to appear on the cover of a UK magazine.
- 2019: Washington became the first U.S. state to recognize Asexual Awareness Week, which it did through a ceremonial proclamation signed by governor Jay Inslee.

=== 2020s ===
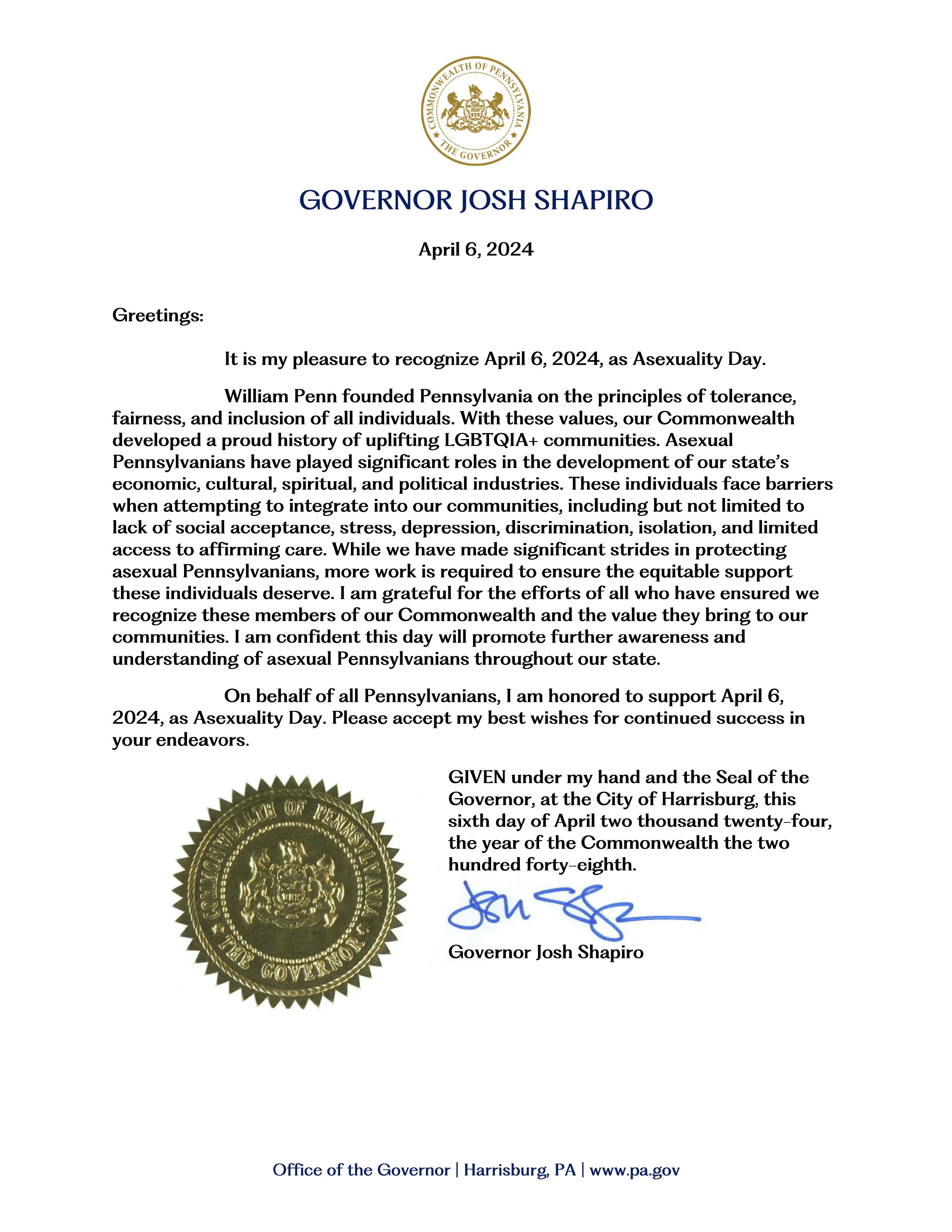
Pennsylvania governor Josh Shapiro’s message recognizing April 6, 2024 as Asexuality Day.

- 2020: Jaymee Mak (an allosexual woman), wrote, produced, and co-starred in the short film It's Not You. It's Not Me., which was inspired by her relationship with an asexual man.
- 2020: Rhea Debussy, an asexual transgender rights activist, became the founding executive director of the Ace and Aro Alliance of Central Ohio, which is Ohio's first asexual organization.
- 2020: The first Virtual Asexual Pride took place from June 17 until June 30, hosted by Jaymie Doyle. The Virtual Asexual Pride was hosted online via social media due to the COVID-19 pandemic and was intended to continue Asexual Pride for Ireland and Northern Ireland virtually.
- 2022: YouTuber Jaiden Animations comes out as aromantic and asexual in her video: "Being Not Straight". Her animation reached over 20 million views and is currently the most viewed video on YouTube about asexuality and aromanticism.
- 2022: Always Be You... Except You is the first known film to star an entirely ace identifying cast. It should be noted however that actor Daniel Mart did not come out as asexual until a year after the film had come out.
- 2023: The world's first in-person Asexual Pride Parade was held in Budapest, Hungary on 15 April 2023. About 160 people participated in the march. (Organized by the Hungarian Asexual Community group.)
- 2023: Yasmin Benoit became the first openly asexual grand marshal for NYC Pride.
- 2024: Pennsylvania governor Josh Shapiro issued a message recognizing April 6, 2024 as Asexuality Day.
- 2025: All "lesbian, gay, bisexual, transgender, queer, intersex, asexual (LGBTQIA+)" acts or practices ("pratiques") are currently criminalized in Niger based on Article 25 of Niger's "Charte de la Refondation" ("Refoundation Charter"), adopted in March 2025 by the country's ruling military junta.
