= Asexual flag =

Pride flag

- Proportion: 3:5
- Adopted: 2010; 16 years ago
- Design: Four horizontal stripes colored respectively with black, grey, white, and purple

The asexual flag is a pride flag representing the asexual community created in 2010 by a member of the Asexual Visibility and Education Network (AVEN) known by the alias 'standup'. The flag features four horizontal stripes of equal size. From top to bottom, the stripes are black, gray, white, and purple. The black stripe represents asexuality, the gray stripe represents greysexuality and demisexuality, the white stripe represents allosexuality (or, sometimes, allies), and the purple stripe represents the community as a whole. The flag is often flown at pride events and is used to represent the asexual community.

Standup's asexual flag has become one of the most recognizable symbols associated with asexual identity.

== History and design ==
The first logo of the Asexuality Visibility and Education Network (AVEN), used from 2002 to 2005

The logo of the Asexual Visibility and Education Network (AVEN), the "AVEN Triangle"

The half-filled heart, another symbol of asexuality used before the adoption of a flag.

The origin of the colors of the asexual flag is the AVEN triangle which was used in the past to represent asexuality. The original iteration of the AVEN triangle, made by David Jay, was a black-bordered white triangle with the bottom third of it filled in black. The top of the triangle represented the Kinsey scale and the bottom point expanding the line to include asexuality. In 2004, Jay disavowed his original model of asexuality as being overly-simplistic and restrictive. In 2005, the black-and-white triangle would be replaced with a gradient, to represent the spectrum of asexual orientation. The AVEN triangle would remain the primary symbol of asexuality, with some minor aesthetic changes.

However, it was criticized for being associated with a website, rather than all asexuals as a whole. An alternate symbol was a half-filled heart, however, many aromantic asexuals criticized it as being unrepresentative due to it implying romantic attraction. In Summer 2010, a number of flag designs were proposed to fix this issue, and were voted upon. The winning design was made up of four equally-sized horizontal stripes in black, gray, white, and purple, the colors of the AVEN triangle, designed to match other pride flags with horizontal stripes. The black is to represent asexuals, while the gray is for demisexuals and grayasexuals, the white for allosexual allies, and the purple for the community.

== Related flags ==
The asexual flag has become an inspiration for many other pride flags, especially those in the asexual spectrum.

The demisexual flag's origin is not entirely known, it contains a black triangle on the left pointing inwards towards the center, with 3 stripes in white, purple, and gray, with the purple stripe being thinner than the white and gray stripes. The colors on the demisexual flag share symbolism with the asexual flag.

The grayasexual flag was designed by Milith Rusignuolo in 2013, containing 5 equal horizontal stripes with purple being in the top and bottom stripes, gray being right next to the middle stripe, and the middle stripe being in white. Similar to the demisexual flag, it also shares symbolism with the asexual flag.

The demiromantic and grayaromantic flags are the same as their demisexual and grayasexual counterparts, but with the green replacing the purple, as green represents the aromantic spectrum in the aromantic flag.

The aroace flag contains five equal horizontal stripes in orange, yellow, white, light blue, and then dark blue. The orange and shades of blue were chosen as both are in between the green in the aromantic flag and the purple in the asexual flag on the color wheel.

Demiromantic flag

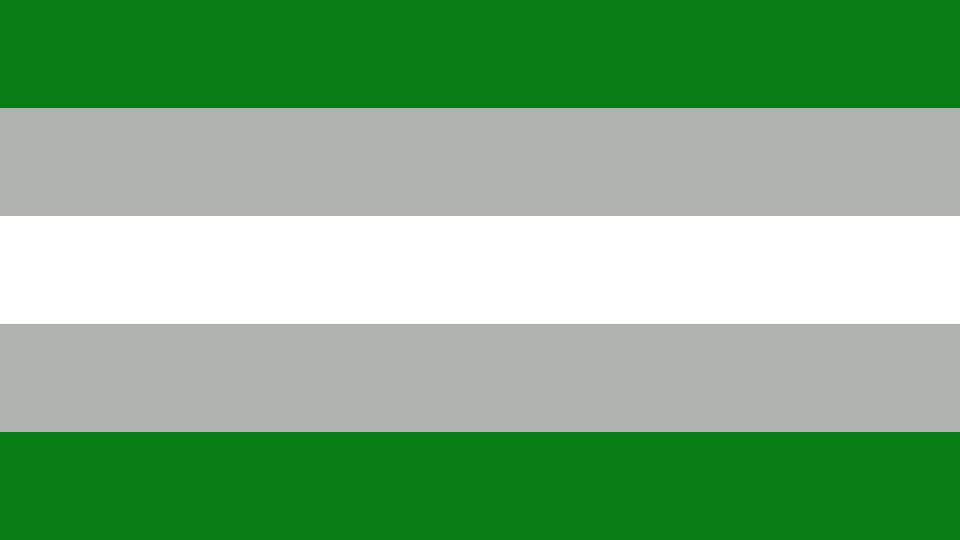
Grayaromantic flag

Demisexual flag

Grayasexual flag

Aroace flag
