= Autosexuality =

Sexual orientation as attraction to oneself

- Etymology: auto- + sexuality
- Definition: Attraction to oneself
- Coined by: Sexual therapist Bernard Apfelbaum
- First used: 1989

Other terms
- Associated terms: Sologamy; Asexuality; Autoromantic

Flag
- Autosexual pride flag The autosexual pride flag
- Flag name: Autosexual pride flag
- Designer: Unspecified

Autosexuality is a sexual orientation defined as sexual attraction primarily to oneself. Autoromantic is the romantic equivalent. Autosexuality is sometimes, but not exclusively, described as being on the asexual spectrum.

== Definition ==
Autosexuality is a type of sexual orientation that is sexual attraction primarily to oneself. It can manifest as being aroused by one's own appearance, fantasizing about oneself, preference for being single, or preference for solo masturbation.

Autosexuality can also be referred to as a spectrum; some autosexuals may also experience sexual attraction to other people, by varying degrees. OB/GYN doctor Maureen Slattery mentioned that "all sexuality exists on a spectrum and all humans have some autosexual tendencies".

Some autosexuals may pursue marriage with themselves, called sologamy. Autosexuals are also reported to have stronger senses of self-confidence.

Autosexuality has not been widely studied. The term is reported to be coined in 1989 by the sexual therapist Bernard Apfelbaum, who incorrectly classified it as part of narcissism.

=== Autoromanticism ===
Autoromanticism is romantic attraction primarily to oneself. The mental health center of San Diego said that autoromantic people "may engage in self-dates, celebrate romantic milestones alone, and treat themselves as their own ideal partner", and that individuals may be both autoromantic and autosexual, or only one or the other.

== Misconceptions ==
Psychotherapist and sex educator Roger Kuhn said "[a] major misconception about autosexuality has to do with someone not feeling loved or accepted by others, so they reject love and choose themselves". He states that while some autosexuals may share that experience, the majority do not. Another myth is that autosexual people cannot have romantic relationships, although autoromantic people may not have them.

It is distinguished from narcissism and narcissistic personality disorder (NPD), with narcissism and NPD being a trait and personality disorder respectively, and autosexuality being a sexual orientation. Autosexuality is also referred to as being "not atypical or unhealthy".

Autosexuality is also not to be confused with autoeroticism, as autosexuality is considered a sexual orientation, while autoeroticism is not.

== In pop culture ==
Autosexuality was discussed on the talk show The View.
