= Asexuality =

Lack of or little sexual attraction to others

- Definition: Little to no sexual attraction to others; low or absent sexual desire or interest in sexual activity
- Abbreviations: ace
- Subcategories: Gray asexuality; demisexuality; aegosexuality; aceflux; autosexuality; fraysexuality; fictosexuality

Flag
- Asexual pride flag
- Flag name: Asexual pride flag
- Meaning: Black for asexuality; gray for gray-asexuality; white for allosexuality; purple for community

Asexuality is the lack of sexual attraction to others, or low or absent interest in or desire for sexual activity. It may be considered a sexual orientation, or the lack thereof. It may also be categorized more widely as a range of asexual sub-identities called the ace spectrum. The term ace is often used colloquially to describe those who are asexual or part of the ace spectrum.

Asexuality is distinct from sexual abstinence and from celibacy, which are behavioral and generally motivated by factors such as an individual's personal, social, or religious beliefs. Sexual orientation, unlike sexual behavior, is believed to be "enduring". Some asexual people engage in sexual activity despite lacking sexual attraction or a desire for sex, for a number of reasons, such as a desire to physically please themselves or romantic partners, or a desire to have children.

Acceptance of asexuality as a sexual orientation and field of scientific research is still relatively new, as a growing body of research from both sociological and psychological perspectives has begun to develop. While some researchers assert that asexuality is a sexual orientation, other researchers disagree. Institutions such as APA and the UN consider asexuality to be a sexual orientation. Asexual individuals may represent about one percent of the population.

Various asexual communities have started to form since the impact of the Internet and social media in the mid-1990s. The most prolific and well-known of these communities is the Asexual Visibility and Education Network, which was founded in 2001 by David Jay.

== Definition, identity and relationships ==
Because there is significant variation among those who identify as asexual, the term asexuality can encompass broad definitions. Researchers generally define asexuality as the lack of sexual attraction or the lack of interest in sexual activity, though specific definitions vary—the term may be used to refer to individuals with low or absent sexual behavior or exclusively romantic non-sexual partnerships in addition to low or absent sexual desire or attraction.

Asexuality is often abbreviated as ace, a phonetic shortening of asexual, and the community as a whole is likewise referred to as the ace community.

=== Relationships ===
Simplified diagram of the aromantic and asexual spectra

Despite lacking sexual attraction, some asexuals might engage in purely romantic relationships, while others may not. Some who identify as asexual report that they experience sexual attraction, though lack the inclination to act on it, citing no desire to engage in sexual activity—some asexuals also lack the desire to engage in non-sexual physical activity such as cuddling or hand-holding, while others choose to do so. Asexual people may seek relationships without romantic or sexual activity, known as "queerplatonic relationships". A squish is a term used by the asexual community to describe a platonic crush.

Certain asexuals may participate in sexual activity out of curiosity. Some may also masturbate as a form of solitary release, while others may not feel a need to do so. The desire for masturbation or other sexual activity is often referred to as sex drive by asexuals, who disassociate it from sexual attraction and being asexual; asexuals who masturbate generally consider it to be a normal product of the human body rather than a sign of latent sexuality, and others do not find it pleasurable. Some asexual men are unable to get an erection and are unable to attempt penetration. Asexuals also differ in their views on performing sexual acts: some are indifferent and may engage in sexual activity for the benefit of a romantic partner, while others are more strongly averse to the idea, though they are not typically against sex as a whole so as to condemn other people for engaging in any form of sexual activity.

Many who identify as asexual may identify with diverse gender identities or classifications of romantic orientation. These are often integrated with a person's asexual identity, and asexuals may still identify as heterosexual, lesbian, gay, bisexual or pansexual regarding romantic or emotional aspects of sexual orientation or sexual identity in addition to identifying as asexual. The romantic aspects of sexual orientations may also be indicated by a variety of romantic identities, including biromantic, heteroromantic, homoromantic, or panromantic, and those who do not experience romantic attraction may identify as aromantic. This split between romantic and sexual orientation is commonly explained as the split attraction model, which states that romantic and sexual attraction are not strictly linked for all people. Individuals who are both aromantic and asexual are sometimes known as aro-ace or aroace.

=== Romantic and interpersonal relationships ===
Asexual people can have vast differences in matters related to romantic attraction, intimacy and relationship building. Although asexuals experience little to no sexual attraction, most asexual individuals are romantically attracted. A 2020 study found 74% of asexual participants reported experiencing romantic attraction, with 38.3% being biromantic, 26.4% heteroromantic, 4.9% homoromantic, and 5.1% reporting another romantic orientation. The study also found that the percentage of the romantic asexuals who identified as heteroromantic was less than half that of the romantic allosexuals (those experiencing sexual attraction).

Studies in 2011 and 2017 concluded that asexual people have various relationship formats such as long-term romantic relationships, queerplatonic relationships, and mixed-orientation relationships between an asexual person and an allosexual person. Emotional intimacy, understanding of each other, and boundary and expectation communication are strongly related to relationship satisfaction among asexual people. These studies also concluded that successful partnerships often involve clear negotiation of physical affection, respect for differing needs, and flexibility in defining what intimacy means for each partner. In mixed-orientation relationships especially, couples may develop tailored arrangements that accommodate both partners’ comfort levels while preserving trust and mutual support.

A 2012 study concluded that asexual people also might have difficulties in dealing with social stigma, their compulsion to have sex, or their partners not understanding them. These experiences may add to minority stress but are usually alleviated by positive social networks and communities.

=== Gray asexuality ===
The term gray asexuality refers to the spectrum between asexuality and non-asexuality (also referred to as allosexuality). Individuals who identify as gray asexual may occasionally experience sexual attraction, or only experience sexual attraction as a secondary component once a reasonably stable or large emotional connection has been formed with the target, known as demisexuality.

== Research ==
=== Prevalence ===
Kinsey scale of sexual responses, indicating degrees of sexual orientation. The original scale included a designation of "X", indicating a lack of sexual behavior.

Estimates for the prevalence of asexuality have ranged from 0.4% to 4%, though the most common statistic given is that approximately 1% of the population is asexual. Consistently, more women and non-binary people identify as asexual than men. A 2019 study in the United States found that 1.66% of sexual minorities surveyed identified themselves as asexual. It is not a new aspect of human sexuality, but it is relatively new to public discourse. In comparison to other sexualities, asexuality has received little attention from the scientific community, and there is relatively little quantitative data available about the prevalence of asexuality. In his creation of the Kinsey scale, which he used to rate individuals' sexual activity from 0 (exclusively heterosexual) to 6 (exclusively homosexual), Alfred Kinsey included an additional category, "X", for individuals with "no socio-sexual contacts or reactions". Kinsey labeled 1.5% of the adult male population as X. Although in modern times, this category has been interpreted as representing asexual people, scholar Justin J. Lehmiller has noted that "the Kinsey X classification emphasized a lack of sexual behavior, whereas the modern definition of asexuality emphasizes a lack of sexual attraction. As such, the Kinsey Scale may not be sufficient for accurate classification of asexuality". In his second book, Sexual Behavior in the Human Female, Kinsey reported a breakdown of individuals who fall under the X category: unmarried females = 14–19%, married females = 1–3%, previously married females = 5–8%, unmarried males = 3–4%, married males = 0%, and previously married males = 1–2%.

Further empirical data about an asexual demographic appeared in 1994 when a research team in the United Kingdom carried out a comprehensive survey of 18,876 British residents, spurred by the need for sexual information in the wake of the AIDS pandemic. The survey included a question on sexual attraction, to which 1.05% of the respondents replied that they had "never felt sexually attracted to anyone at all". The study of this phenomenon was continued by Canadian sexuality researcher Anthony Bogaert in 2004, who explored the asexual demographic in a series of studies. Bogaert's research indicated that 1% of the British population does not experience sexual attraction, but he believed that the 1% figure was not an accurate reflection of the likely much larger percentage of the population that could be identified as asexual, noting that 30% of people contacted for the initial survey chose not to participate in the survey. Since less sexually experienced people are more likely to refuse to participate in studies about sexuality, and asexuals tend to be less sexually experienced than allosexuals, asexuals were likely under-represented in the responding participants. The same study found the number of homosexuals and bisexuals combined to be about 1.1% of the population, which is much smaller than other studies indicate.

Contrasting Bogaert's 1% figure, a study by Aicken et al., published in 2013, suggests that, based on Natsal-2 data from 2000 to 2001, the prevalence of asexuality in Britain is only 0.4% for the age range 16–44. This percentage indicates a decrease from the 0.9% figure determined from the Natsal-1 data collected on the same age-range a decade earlier. A 2015 analysis by Bogaert also found a similar decline between the Natsal-1 and Natsal-2 data. Aicken, Mercer, and Cassell found some evidence of ethnic differences among respondents who had not experienced sexual attraction; both men and women of Indian and Pakistani origin had a higher likelihood of reporting a lack of sexual attraction.

In a survey conducted by YouGov in 2015, 1,632 British adults were asked to try to place themselves on the Kinsey scale. 1% of participants answered "No sexuality". The breakdown of participants was 0% men, 2% women, and 1% across all age ranges.

In a nationwide survey conducted in Japan in 2023 by the National Institute of Population and Social Security Research, 49 respondents (0.9%) out of 5,339 valid responses identified their sexual orientation as asexual. In the same survey, 0.4% identified as gay, lesbian, or homosexual, and 1.8% identified as bisexual. This survey "reports that 1.3% of cisgender women and 0.3% of cisgender men identify as asexual, 1.6% (86 people) of all respondents may be classified as aromantic asexual, 1.5% (81 people) of all respondents may be classified as romantic asexual, and 1.1% (58 people) of all respondents may be classified as aromantic sexual".

In a separate survey conducted in 2019 by the National Institute of Population and Social Security Research in Osaka City, Japan, among 4,285 valid responses in a randomized survey on sexual minorities, 33 respondents (0.8%) identified their sexual orientation as asexual. When categorized by sex assigned at birth, 0.3% of male respondents and 1.1% of female respondents identified as asexual. The survey also investigated not only self-identification but also experiences of sexual and romantic attraction. According to the results, 1.6% of respondents (0.9% of males and 2.1% of females) reported having never experienced either sexual or romantic attraction. Additionally, 1.3% (0.6% of males and 1.8% of females) reported experiencing only romantic attraction, and 0.8% (1.0% of males and 0.7% of females) reported experiencing only sexual attraction.

=== Sexual orientation, mental health and cause ===
There is significant debate over whether or not asexuality is a sexual orientation. It has been compared and equated with hypoactive sexual desire disorder (HSDD), a diagnosis which was in the DSM-4, in that both imply a general lack of sexual attraction to anyone; HSDD has been used to medicalize asexuality, but asexuality is generally not considered a disorder or a sexual dysfunction (such as anorgasmia, anhedonia, etc.), because it does not necessarily define someone as having a medical problem or problems relating to others socially. Unlike people with HSDD, asexual people normally do not experience "marked distress" and "interpersonal difficulty" concerning feelings about their sexuality, or generally a lack of sexual arousal; asexuality is considered the lack or absence of sexual attraction as a life-enduring characteristic. One study found that, compared to HSDD subjects, asexuals reported lower levels of sexual desire, sexual experience, sex-related distress, and depressive symptoms. Researchers Richards and Barker report that asexuals do not have disproportionate rates of alexithymia, depression, or personality disorders. Some people, however, may identify as asexual even if their non-sexual state is explained by one or more of the aforementioned disorders. Academic Angela Chen has argued that this distinction is illogical since discrimination and bigotry faced by asexual people can cause distress. She believes that when low sexual desire is inherently seen as a problem, people will want to cure it, but that people should not have to feel like they have a "moral obligation" to increase their sexual desire.

Since the release of the DSM-5 in 2013, which split HSDD into diagnoses for female sexual arousal disorder and male hypoactive sexual desire disorder, both disorders have been criticised for similar issues to HSDD. Although the DSM-5 mentions asexuality as an exclusion criterion for these two disorders, individuals must self-identify as asexual to meet the differential diagnosis and this requirement has been criticised for imposing a diagnosis on people who are possibly asexual but do not yet identify as such. As of 2021, HSDD continues to be used to describe transgender women.

The first study that gave empirical data about asexuals was published in 1983 by Paula Nurius concerning the relationship between sexual orientation and mental health. 689 subjects—most of whom were students at various universities in the United States taking psychology or sociology classes—were given several surveys, including four clinical well-being scales. In the results, asexuals were more likely to have low self-esteem and more likely to be depressed than members of other sexual orientations: 25.88% of heterosexuals, 26.54% of bisexuals (called "ambisexuals"), 29.88% of homosexuals, and 33.57% of asexuals were reported to have problems with self-esteem. A similar trend existed for depression. For various reasons, Nurius did not believe that firm conclusions could be drawn from this.

In a 2013 study, Yule et al. looked into mental health variances between Caucasian heterosexuals, homosexuals, bisexuals, and asexuals. The results of 203 male and 603 female participants were included in the findings. Yule et al. found that asexual male participants were more likely to report having a mood disorder than other males, particularly in comparison to heterosexual participants. The same was found for female asexual participants over their heterosexual counterparts; however, non-asexual, non-heterosexual females had the highest rates. Asexual participants of both sexes were more likely to have anxiety disorders than heterosexual and non-heterosexual participants, as were they more likely than heterosexual participants to report having had recent suicidal feelings. Yule et al. hypothesized that some of these differences may be due to discrimination and other societal factors.

With regard to sexual orientation categories, asexuality may be argued as not being a meaningful category to add to the continuum and instead argued as the lack of sexual orientation or sexuality. Other arguments propose that asexuality is the denial of one's natural sexuality and that it is a disorder caused by shame of sexuality, anxiety, or sexual abuse, sometimes basing this belief on asexuals who masturbate or occasionally engage in sexual activity to please a romantic partner. Within the context of sexual orientation identity politics, asexuality may pragmatically fulfill the political function of a sexual orientation identity category.

The suggestion that asexuality is a sexual dysfunction is controversial among the asexual community. Those who identify as asexual usually prefer it to be recognized as a sexual orientation. Scholars who argue that asexuality is a sexual orientation may point to the existence of different sexual preferences. They and many asexual people believe that the lack of sexual attraction is valid enough to be categorized as a sexual orientation. The researchers argue that asexuals do not choose to have no sexual desire and generally start to find out their differences in sexual behaviors around adolescence. Because of these facts coming to light, it is reasoned that asexuality is more than a behavioral choice and is not something that can be cured like a disorder. There is also analysis on whether identifying as asexual is becoming more popular.

Research on the etiology of sexual orientation when applied to asexuality has the definitional problem of sexual orientation not consistently being defined by researchers as including asexuality. While heterosexuality, homosexuality and bisexuality are usually, but not always, determined during the early years of preadolescent life, it is not known when asexuality is determined. "It is unclear whether these characteristics [viz., "lacking interest in or desire for sex"] are thought to be lifelong, or if they may be acquired".

One criterion usually taken to define a sexual orientation is that it is stable over time. In a 2016 analysis in the Archives of Sexual Behavior, Brotto et al. found "only weak support" for this criterion being met among asexual individuals. An analysis of data from the National Longitudinal Study of Adolescent to Adult Health by Stephen Cranney found that, of 14 (Note: This denominator is mistakenly given as 25 in the abstract of Cranney's initial study. The number of individuals who reported no sexual attraction in wave III was 14, according to Table 2, the first paragraph of the section "Multivariate Analysis", and the following quote from Cranney's subsequent commentary: "Specifically, of the 14 people who indicated 'no sexual attraction' in Wave III, only three went on to do so in Wave IV (Table 2).") individuals who reported no sexual attraction in the study's third wave (when subjects ranged in age from 18 to 26), only 3 continued to identify in this way at the fourth wave, six years later. However, Cranney notes that asexual identification in the third wave was still significant as a predictor of asexual identification in the subsequent wave. In a subsequent commentary, Cranney stated that the interpretation of this data was complicated by the absence of any "set quantitative standard for how long a sexual desire must last before it is considered stable or intrinsic enough to be considered an orientation".

=== Sexual activity and sexuality ===
While some asexuals masturbate as a solitary form of release or have sex for the benefit of a romantic partner, others do not (see above). Fischer et al. reported that "scholars who study the physiology of asexuality suggest that people who are asexual are capable of genital arousal but may experience difficulty with so-called subjective arousal". This means that "while the body becomes aroused, subjectively – at the level of the mind and emotions – one does not experience arousal".

The Kinsey Institute sponsored another small survey on the topic in 2007, which found that self-identified asexuals "reported significantly less desire for sex with a partner, lower sexual arousability, and lower sexual excitation but did not differ consistently from non-asexuals in their sexual inhibition scores or their desire to masturbate".

A 1977 paper titled Asexual and Autoerotic Women: Two Invisible Groups, by Myra T. Johnson, is explicitly devoted to asexuality in humans. Johnson defines asexuals as those men and women "who, regardless of physical or emotional condition, actual sexual history, and marital status or ideological orientation, seem to prefer not to engage in sexual activity". She contrasts autoerotic women with asexual women: "The asexual woman ... has no sexual desires at all [but] the autoerotic woman ... recognizes such desires but prefers to satisfy them alone". Johnson's evidence is mostly letters to the editor found in women's magazines written by asexual/autoerotic women. She portrays them as invisible, "oppressed by a consensus that they are non-existent," and left behind by both the sexual revolution and the feminist movement. Johnson argued that society either ignores or denies their existence or insists they must be ascetic for religious reasons, neurotic, or asexual for political reasons.

In a study published in 1979 in volume five of Advances in the Study of Affect, as well as in another article using the same data and published in 1980 in the Journal of Personality and Social Psychology, Michael D. Storms of the University of Kansas outlined his own reimagining of the Kinsey scale. Whereas Kinsey measured sexual orientation based on a combination of actual sexual behavior and fantasizing and eroticism, Storms used only fantasizing and eroticism. Storms, however, placed hetero-eroticism and homo-eroticism on separate axes rather than at two ends of a single scale; this allows for a distinction between bisexuality (exhibiting both hetero- and homo-eroticism in degrees comparable to hetero- or homosexuals, respectively) and asexuality (exhibiting a level of homo-eroticism comparable to a heterosexual and a level of hetero-eroticism comparable to a homosexual, namely, little to none). This type of scale accounted for asexuality for the first time. Storms conjectured that many researchers following Kinsey's model could be mis-categorizing asexual subjects as bisexual, because both were simply defined by a lack of preference for gender in sexual partners.

In a 1983 study by Paula Nurius, which included 689 subjects (most of whom were students at various universities in the United States taking psychology or sociology classes), the two-dimensional fantasizing and eroticism scale was used to measure sexual orientation. Based on the results, respondents were given a score ranging from 0 to 100 for hetero-eroticism and from 0 to 100 for homo-eroticism. Respondents who scored lower than 10 on both were labeled "asexual". This consisted of 5% of the males and 10% of the females. In the study, asexuals reported much lower frequency and desired frequency of a variety of sexual activities, including having multiple partners, anal sexual activities, having sexual encounters in a variety of locations, and autoerotic activities.

=== Feminist research ===
The field of asexuality studies is still emerging as a subset of the broader field of gender and sexuality studies. Notable researchers who have produced significant works in asexuality studies include KJ Cerankowski, Ela Przybylo, and CJ DeLuzio Chasin.

A 2010 paper written by KJ Cerankowski and Megan Milks, titled New Orientations: Asexuality and Its Implications for Theory and Practice, suggests that asexuality may be somewhat of a question in itself for the studies of gender and sexuality. Cerankowski and Milks have suggested that asexuality raises many more questions than it resolves, such as how a person could abstain from having sex, which is generally accepted by society to be the most basic of instincts. Their New Orientations paper states that society has deemed "[LGBT and] female sexuality as empowered or repressed. The asexual movement challenges that assumption by challenging many of the basic tenets of pro-sex feminism [in which it is] already defined as repressive or anti-sex sexualities". In addition to accepting self-identification as asexual, the Asexual Visibility and Education Network has formulated asexuality as a biologically determined orientation. This formula, if dissected scientifically and proven, would support researcher Simon LeVay's blind study of the hypothalamus in gay men, women, and straight men, which indicates that there is a biological difference between straight men and gay men.

In 2014, Cerankowski and Milks edited and published Asexualities: Feminist and Queer Perspectives, a collection of essays intended to explore the politics of asexuality from a feminist and queer perspective. It is broken into the introduction and then six parts: Theorizing Asexuality: New Orientations; The Politics of Asexuality; Visualizing Asexuality in Media Culture; Asexuality and Masculinity; Health, Disability, and Medicalization; and Reading Asexually: Asexual Literary Theory. Each part contains two to three papers on a given aspect of asexuality research. One such paper is written by Ela Przybylo, another name becoming common in asexual scholarly literature. Her article about the Cerankowski and Milks anthology focuses on accounts of self-identified male asexuals, with a particular focus on the pressures men experience towards having sex in dominant Western discourse and media. Three men living in Southern Ontario, Canada, were interviewed in 2011, and Przybylo admits that the small sample size means that her findings cannot be generalized to a greater population in terms of representation and that they are "exploratory and provisional", especially in a field that is still lacking in theorizations. All three interviewees addressed being affected by the stereotype that men have to enjoy and want sex in order to be "real men".

Another of Przybylo's works, Asexuality and the Feminist Politics of "Not Doing It", published in 2011, takes a feminist lens to scientific writings on asexuality. Pryzyblo argues that asexuality is made possible only through the Western context of "sexual, coital, and heterosexual imperatives". She addresses earlier works by Dana Densmore, Valerie Solanas, and Breanne Fahs, who argued for "asexuality and celibacy" as radical feminist political strategies against patriarchy. While Przybylo does make some distinctions between asexuality and celibacy, she considers blurring the lines between the two to be productive for a feminist understanding of the topic. In her 2013 article, "Producing Facts: Empirical Asexuality and the Scientific Study of Sex", Przybylo distinguishes between two different stages of asexual research: that of the late 1970s to the early 1990s, which often included a very limited understanding of asexuality, and the more recent revisiting of the subject which she says began with Bogaert's 2004 study and has popularized the subject and made it more "culturally visible". In this article, Przybylo once again asserts the understanding of asexuality as a cultural phenomenon, and continues to be critical of its scientific study. Pryzblo published a book, Asexual Erotics, in 2019. In this book, she argued that asexuality poses a "paradox" in that is a sexual orientation that is defined by the absence of sexual activity entirely. She distinguishes between a sociological understanding of asexuality and a cultural understanding, which she said could include "the open mesh of possibilities, gaps, overlaps, dissonances and resonances".

CJ DeLuzio Chasin states in Reconsidering Asexuality and Its Radical Potential that academic research on asexuality "has positioned asexuality in line with essentialist discourses of sexual orientation" which is troublesome as it creates a binary between asexuals and persons who have been subjected to psychiatric intervention for disorders such as Hypoactive Sexual Desire Disorder. Chasin says that this binary implies that all asexuals experience a lifelong (hence, enduring) lack of sexual attraction, that all non-asexuals who experience a lack of sexual desire experience distress over it, and that it pathologizes asexuals who do experience such distress. As Chasin says such diagnoses as HSDD act to medicalize and govern women's sexuality, the article aims to "unpack" problematic definitions of asexuality that are harmful to both asexuals and women alike. Chasin states that asexuality has the power to challenge commonplace discourse of the naturalness of sexuality, but that the unquestioned acceptance of its current definition does not allow for this. Chasin also argues there and elsewhere in Making Sense in and of the Asexual Community: Navigating Relationships and Identities in a Context of Resistance that it is important to interrogate why someone might be distressed about low sexual desire. Chasin further argues that clinicians have an ethical obligation to avoid treating low sexual desire per se as pathological, and to discuss asexuality as a viable possibility (where relevant) with clients presenting clinically with low sexual desire.

=== Intersections with race and disability ===
Scholar Ianna Hawkins Owen writes, "Studies of race have revealed the deployment of asexuality in the dominant discourse as an ideal sexual behavior to justify both the empowerment of whites and the subordination of blacks to uphold a racialized social and political system". This is partly due to the simultaneous sexualization and de-sexualization of black women in the Mammy archetype, as well as by how society de-sexualizes certain racial minorities, as part of a bid to claim superiority by Whites. This is co-existent with the sexualization of black female bodies in the Jezebel archetype, both utilized to justify slavery and enable further control. Owen also criticizes the "...investment in constructing asexuality upon a white racial rubric (who else can claim access to being just like everyone else?)". Ben Brandley and Angela Labrador argue that asexual identity may be more accessible to white people than people of color because of how people of color are sexualized. Michael Paramo argues in an article for Aze that this can create a "cyclical perception" that the asexual community is dominated by white people which can make people of color continue to feel excluded from it.

Karen Cuthbert comments on "providing the first empirically grounded discussion of this intersection of asexuality and disability (and to a lesser extent gender and 'race')". Eunjung Kim comments on the intersections between disability or crip theory and asexuality, saying disabled people are more frequently de-sexualized. Disabled people who are also asexual have stated that they can feel invisible because of this since they must navigate these assumptions both within the asexual and disabled communities and outside of them. Anna Kurowicka notes that asexual people may sometimes reject the notion that their asexuality is related to disability in an effort to avoid unwanted medical intervention. At the same time, disabled people may reject the assumption that they are inherently asexual. Kurowicka argues that contemporary discourses should trouble the desire to separate asexuality and disability that is rooted in compulsory sexuality.

=== Bogaert's psychological work and theories ===
Bogaert argues that understanding asexuality is of key importance to understanding sexuality in general. For his work, Bogaert defines asexuality as "a lack of lustful inclinations/feelings directed toward others," a definition that he argues is relatively new in light of recent theory and empirical work on sexual orientation. This definition of asexuality also makes clear this distinction between behavior and desire, for both asexuality and celibacy, although Bogaert also notes that there is some evidence of reduced sexual activity for those who fit this definition. He further distinguishes between desire for others and desire for sexual stimulation, the latter of which is not always absent for those who identify as asexual, although he acknowledges that other theorists define asexuality differently and that further research needs to be done on the "complex relationship between attraction and desire". Another distinction is made between romantic and sexual attraction, and he draws on work from developmental psychology, which suggests that romantic systems derive from attachment theory while sexual systems "primarily reside in different brain structures".

Concurrent with Bogaert's suggestion that understanding asexuality will lead to a better understanding of sexuality overall, he discusses the topic of asexual masturbation to theorize on asexuals and "'target-oriented' paraphilia, in which there is an inversion, reversal, or disconnection between the self and the typical target/object of sexual interest/attraction" (such as attraction to oneself, labelled "automonosexualism").

In an earlier 2006 article, Bogaert acknowledges that a distinction between behavior and attraction has been accepted into recent conceptualizations of sexual orientation, which aids in positioning asexuality as such. He adds that, by this framework, "(subjective) sexual attraction is the psychological core of sexual orientation", and also addresses that there may be "some skepticism in [both] the academic and clinical communities" about classifying asexuality as a sexual orientation, and that it raises two objections to such a classification: First, he suggests that there could be an issue with self-reporting (i.e., "a 'perceived' or 'reported' lack of attraction", particularly for definitions of sexual orientation that consider physical arousal over subjective attraction), and, second, he raises the issue of overlap between absent and very low sexual desire, as those with an extremely low desire may still have an "underlying sexual orientation" despite potentially identifying as asexual.

== Community ==
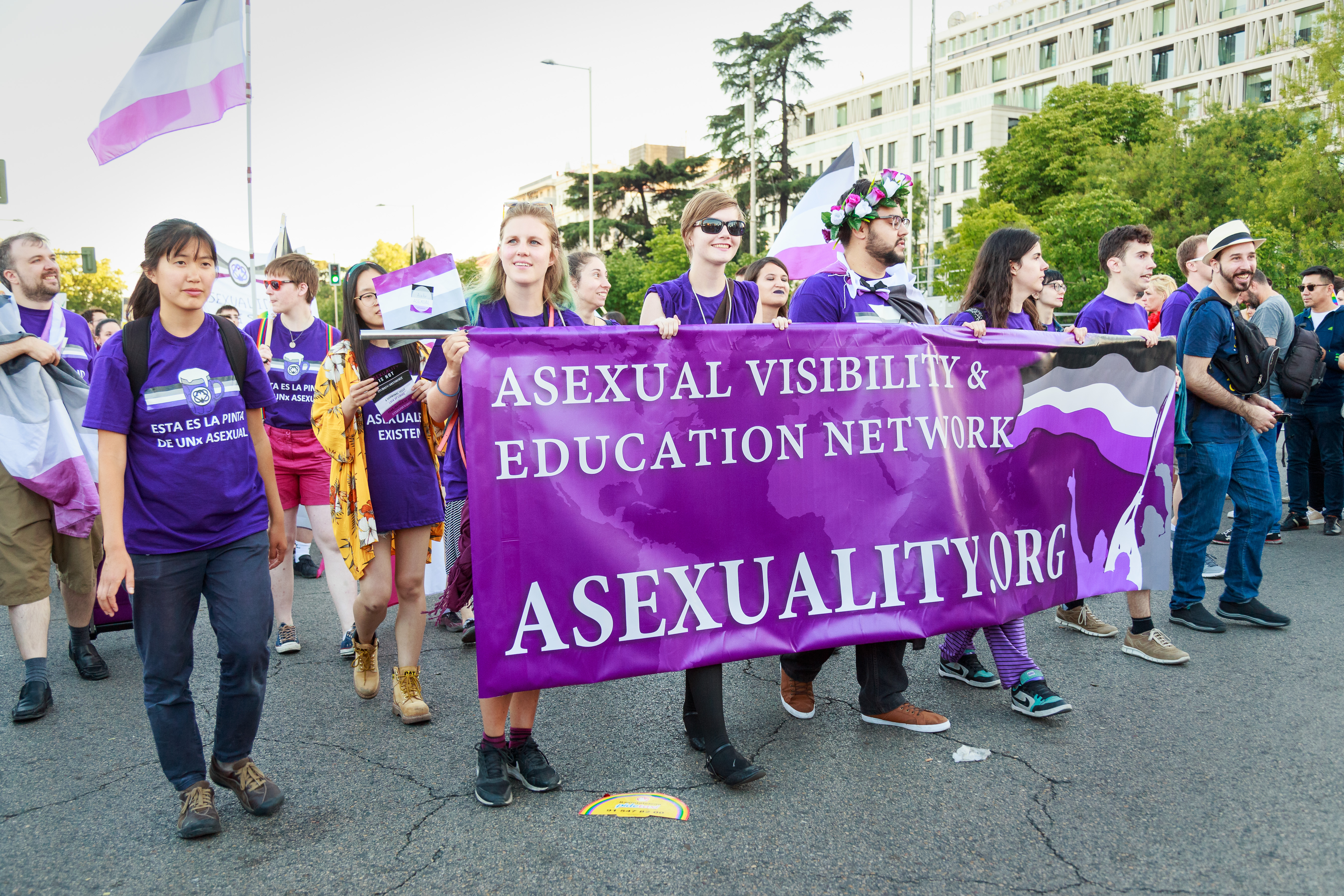
A group of people holding an asexual pride banner, Manifestación WorldPride 2017, Madrid

The history of the asexual community is presently undocumented in academic work. Although several websites for those who fall under the modern definition of asexuality existed online in the 1990s, scholars believe that it was not until the early 21st century when a community of self-identified asexuals began to form, aided by the popularity of online communities. Several small communities existed online, such as the "Leather Spinsters", "Nonolibidoism Society", and "Haven for the Human Amoeba", documented by Volkmar Sigusch. In 2001, activist David Jay founded the Asexual Visibility and Education Network (AVEN), whose stated goals are "creating public acceptance and discussion of asexuality and facilitating the growth of an asexual community".

Some asexuals believe that participation in an asexual community is an important resource, as they often report feeling ostracized in broader society. Communities such as AVEN can be beneficial to those in search of answers when questioning their sexual orientation, such as providing support if one feels their lack of sexual attraction constitutes a disease. Online asexual communities can also serve to inform others about asexuality. However, affiliating with online communities among asexual people vary. Some question the purpose of online communities, while others heavily depend on them for support. According to Elizabeth Abbott, asexuality has always been present in society, though asexual people kept a lower profile. She further stated that while the failure to consummate marriage was seen as an insult to the sacrament of marriage in medieval times, and has been sometimes used as grounds to terminate a marriage, asexuality has never been illegal, unlike homosexuality. However, the recent growth of online communication and social networking as facilitated the growth of a community built upon a common asexual identity.

=== Symbols ===
The asexual pride flag features four horizontal stripes: black, gray, white, and purple, from top to bottom

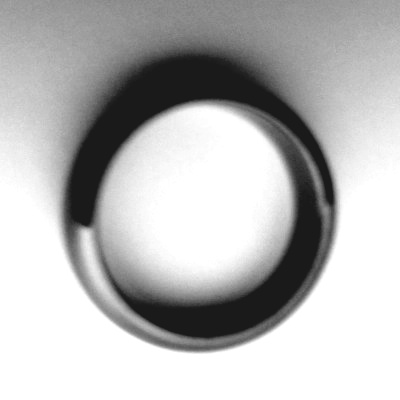
A black ring may be worn on one's right middle finger to indicate asexuality.

In 2009, AVEN members participated in the first asexual entry into an American pride parade at the San Francisco Pride Parade. In 2010, after a period of debate surrounding the existence of a pride flag to represent asexuality, as well as a system to create one, the asexual pride flag was formally announced. The final design was a popular design, and received the most votes in an online open-access poll. The flag's colors—four horizontal stripes of black, gray, white, and purple from top to bottom—represent asexuality, gray-asexuality, allosexuality, and community, respectively. They have also since been used as a representation of asexuality as a whole. Some members of the asexual community additionally opt to wear a black ring on their right middle finger, colloquially known as an "ace ring", as a form of identification. Some asexuals use ace playing card suits as identities of their romantic orientation, such as the ace of spades for aromanticism and the ace of hearts for non-aromanticism.

=== Microlabels ===
Asexual people may use "microlabels" to describe nuances in their experience of sexual attraction. Examples of microlabels include:

- Gray asexuality – orientation in between allosexual and asexual
- Aceflux – sexual orientation fluctuating within the asexual spectrum
- Fraysexuality – (a.k.a. ignotasexuality) only feeling sexual attraction towards strangers and acquaintances and less sexual attraction towards people one knows well, and the opposite of demisexual
- Cupiosexuality – desiring a sexual relationship but not feeling sexual attraction
- Caligosexuality – feeling weak sexual attraction, almost inexistent, often compared metaphorically with vapor, fog, or mist
- Orchidsexuality – feeling sexual attraction but not desiring a sexual relationship, and the opposite of cupiosexual
- Quoisexuality – (a.k.a. wtfsexuality) orientation of being unsure if one experiences sexual attraction
- Reciprosexuality – orientation feeling sexual attraction towards people who feel sexual attraction towards one first, and the opposite of lithosexual
- Lithosexuality – (a.k.a. lithsexuality, akoisexuality, akiosexuality, or aprosexuality) orientation feeling sexual attraction but not wanting it reciprocated
- Placiosexuality – desiring to provide sexual acts but not to receive sexual acts, and the opposite of accipiosexuality
- Accipiosexuality – (a.k.a. iamvanosexuality) desiring to receive sexual acts but not give them
- Aegosexuality – (a.k.a. autochorissexualism) experiences sexual arousal, enjoys sexual content, masturbation, or sexual fantasies, but does not desire sexual activity
- Autosexuality – orientation feeling sexual attraction towards oneself
- Apothisexuality – orientation when one is asexual and sex-repulsed
- Caedsexuality – (a.k.a. caedosexuality) orientation when one was allosexual but now asexual due to trauma
- Requissexuality – (a.k.a. requiessexuality) orientation not feeling sexual attraction due to emotional exhaustion

=== Events ===
On June 29, 2014, AVEN organized the second International Asexuality Conference, as an affiliate WorldPride event in Toronto. The first was held at the 2012 World Pride in London. The second such event, which was attended by around 250 people, was the largest gathering of asexuals to date. The conference included presentations, discussions, and workshops on topics such as research on asexuality, asexual relationships, and intersecting identities.

Ace Week (formerly Asexual Awareness Week) occurs on the last full week in October. It is an awareness period that was created to celebrate and bring awareness to asexuality (including grey asexuality). It was founded by Sara Beth Brooks in 2010.

International Asexuality Day (IAD) is an annual celebration of the asexuality community that takes place on 6 April. The intention for the day is "to place a special emphasis on the international community, going beyond the anglophone and Western sphere that has so far had the most coverage". An international committee spent a little under a year preparing the event, as well as publishing a website and press materials. This committee settled on the date of 6 April to avoid clashing with as many significant dates around the world as possible, although this date is subject to review and may change in future years. The first International Asexuality Day was celebrated in 2021 and involved asexuality organizations from at least 26 countries. Activities included virtual meetups, advocacy programs both online and offline, and the sharing of stories in various art-forms.

=== Arts and literature ===
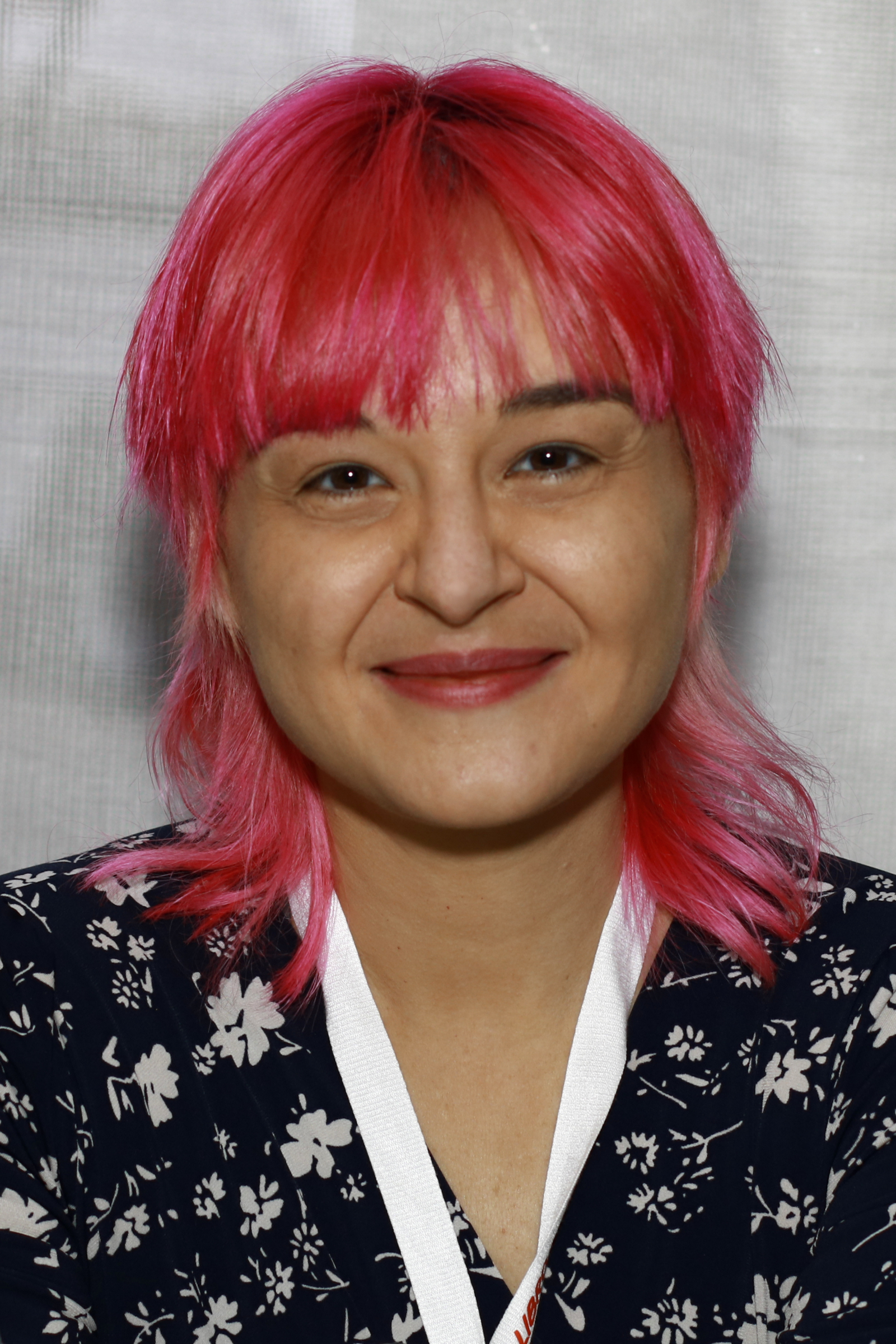
Darcie Little Badger is asexual and has written various short stories and books that explore asexual experiences.

==== Fiction ====
For a series of fictional characters in books and comics who are asexual, see fictional asexual characters. Several works of fiction that have asexual themes have been published:

- Akemi Dawn Bowman's Summer Bird Blue (2018)
- Alice Oseman's Loveless (2020)
- Chuck Tingle's Absolutely No Thoughts Of Pounding... (2021)
- Claire Kann's Let's Talk About Love (2018)
- Cressida Cowell's How To Train Your Dragon series (2003–2015)
- Darcie Little Badger's short stories and Elatsoe (2020)
- Khan Wong's The Circus Infinite (2022)
- Mackenzi Lee's The Lady's Guide to Petticoats and Piracy (2018)
- Naseem Jamnia's The Bruising of Qilwa
- Sayaka Murata's Convenience Store Woman (2018)
- Seanan McGuire's Every Heart a Doorway (2016)

==== Non-fiction ====
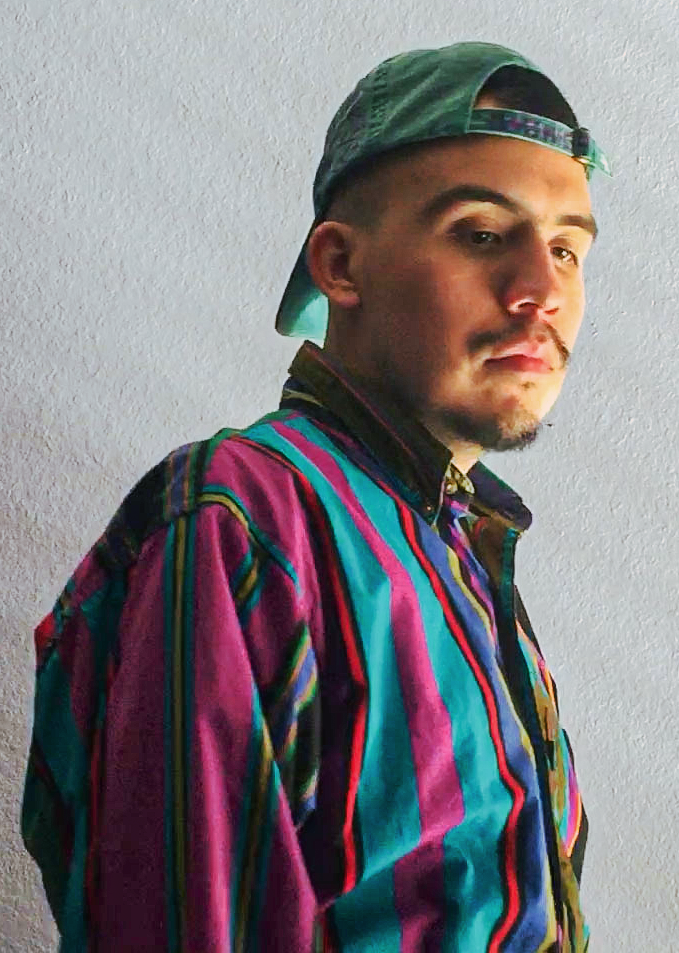
Michael Paramo is the editor of Aze magazine, and author of Ending the Pursuit (2024).

A series of non-fiction articles and books covering asexuality have been published:

- Issues of Aze magazine
- Asexual Erotics: Intimate Readings of Compulsory Sexuality (2019)
- Ace: What Asexuality Reveals About Desire, Society, and the Meaning of Sex (2020)
- How to Be Ace: A Memoir of Growing Up Asexual (2021)
- Ace Voices: What it Means to Be Asexual, Aromantic, Demi or Grey-Ace (2022)
- Refusing Compulsory Sexuality (2022)
- Ace and Aro Journeys: A Guide to Embracing Your Asexual or Aromantic Identity (2023)
- Sounds Fake But Okay: An Asexual and Aromantic Perspective on Love, Relationships, Sex, and Pretty Much Anything Else (2023)
- Ending the Pursuit: Asexuality, Aromanticism, and Agender Identity (2024)

== Religion ==
A study of the general British population found no significant statistical correlation between asexuality and affiliation with any religion (versus affiliation with no religion). Among religious female respondents, the same study found significant differences between religious affiliations; specifically, Muslim women were more likely to report not experiencing any sexual attraction than Christian women. Asexuality is also more common among celibate clergy, as non-asexuals are more likely to be discouraged by vows of chastity.

=== Christianity ===
While the Bible does not directly mention asexuality, Christianity reveres celibacy. In Matthew 19:11–12, Jesus says that "there are eunuchs who were born that way, and there are eunuchs who have been made eunuchs by others – and there are those who choose to live like eunuchs for the sake of the kingdom of heaven". Some biblical exegetes have interpreted "eunuchs who were born that way" as including asexuals. The apostle Paul, writing as a celibate, has been described by some writers as asexual. He wrote in 1 Corinthians 7:6–9,

I wish that all men were as I am. But each man has his own gift from God; one has this gift, another has that. Now to the unmarried and the widows I say: It is good for them to stay unmarried, as I am. But if they cannot control themselves, they should marry, for it is better to marry than to burn with passion.

== Discrimination and legal protections ==
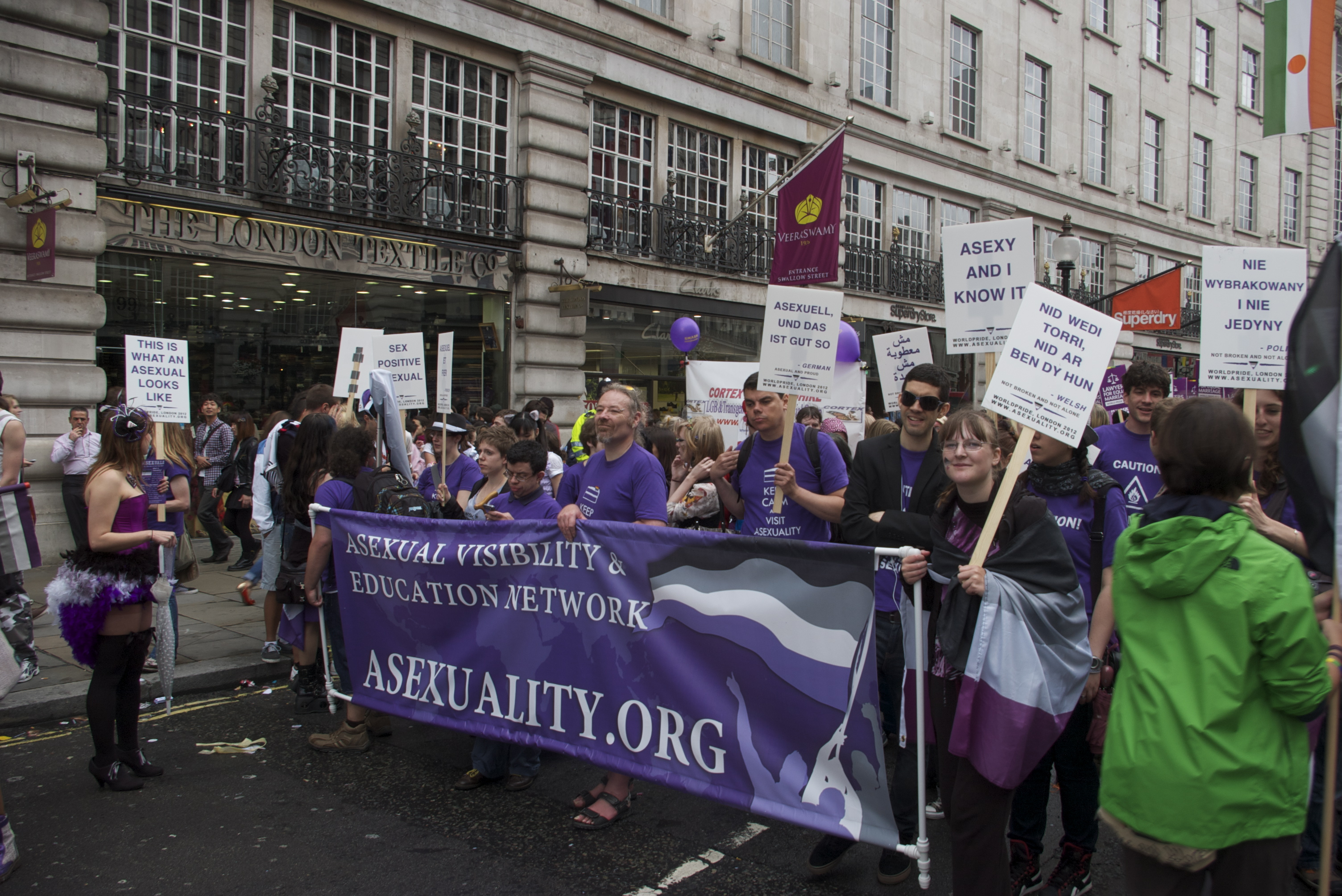
Asexuals marching in a pride parade in London

A 2012 study published in Group Processes & Intergroup Relations reported that asexuals are evaluated more negatively in terms of prejudice, dehumanization and discrimination than other sexual minorities, such as gay men, lesbians and bisexuals. Both homosexual and heterosexual people thought of asexuals as not only cold, but also animalistic and unrestrained. A different study, however, found little evidence of serious discrimination against asexuals because of their asexuality. Asexual activist, author, and blogger Julie Decker has observed that sexual harassment and violence, such as corrective rape, commonly victimizes the asexual community. Sociologist Mark Carrigan sees a middle ground, arguing that while asexuals do often experience discrimination, it is not of a phobic nature but "more about marginalization because people genuinely don't understand asexuality".

Asexuals also face prejudice from the LGBT community. Many LGBT people assume that anyone who is not homosexual or bisexual must be straight and frequently exclude asexuals from their definitions of queer. Although many well-known organizations devoted to aiding LGBTQ communities exist, these organizations generally do not reach out to asexuals and do not provide library materials about asexuality. Upon coming out as asexual, activist Sara Beth Brooks was told by many LGBT people that asexuals are mistaken in their self-identification and seek undeserved attention within the social justice movement. Other LGBT organizations, such as the National LGBTQ Task Force explicitly include asexuals because they are non-heterosexual and can therefore be included in the definition of queer. Some organizations now add an A to the LGBTQ acronym to include asexuals; however, this is still a controversial topic in some queer organizations.

In some jurisdictions, asexuals have legal protections. Since 1999, Brazil has banned pathologization or attempted treatment of sexual orientation by mental health professionals through the national ethical code, and the U.S. state of New York has labeled asexuals as a protected class. However, asexuality does not typically attract the attention of the public or major scrutiny; therefore, it has not been the subject of legislation as much as other sexual orientations have.

=== Legality ===
While it has been claimed that asexuals are not typically subjects of legal punishment, explicit criminalization of asexuality does occur. Niger explicitly criminalizes asexuality, with "asexual acts" being punishable by 5-10 years in prison and a fine, as the result of a law introduced in June 2026, while Russia passed a law in 2015 banning, amongst others, people with "disorders of sexual preference" from obtaining driving licenses. The Association of Russian Lawyers for Human Rights stated that it effectively banned "all transgender people, bigender, asexuals, transvestites, cross-dressers, and people who need sex reassignment" from driving.

== In media ==
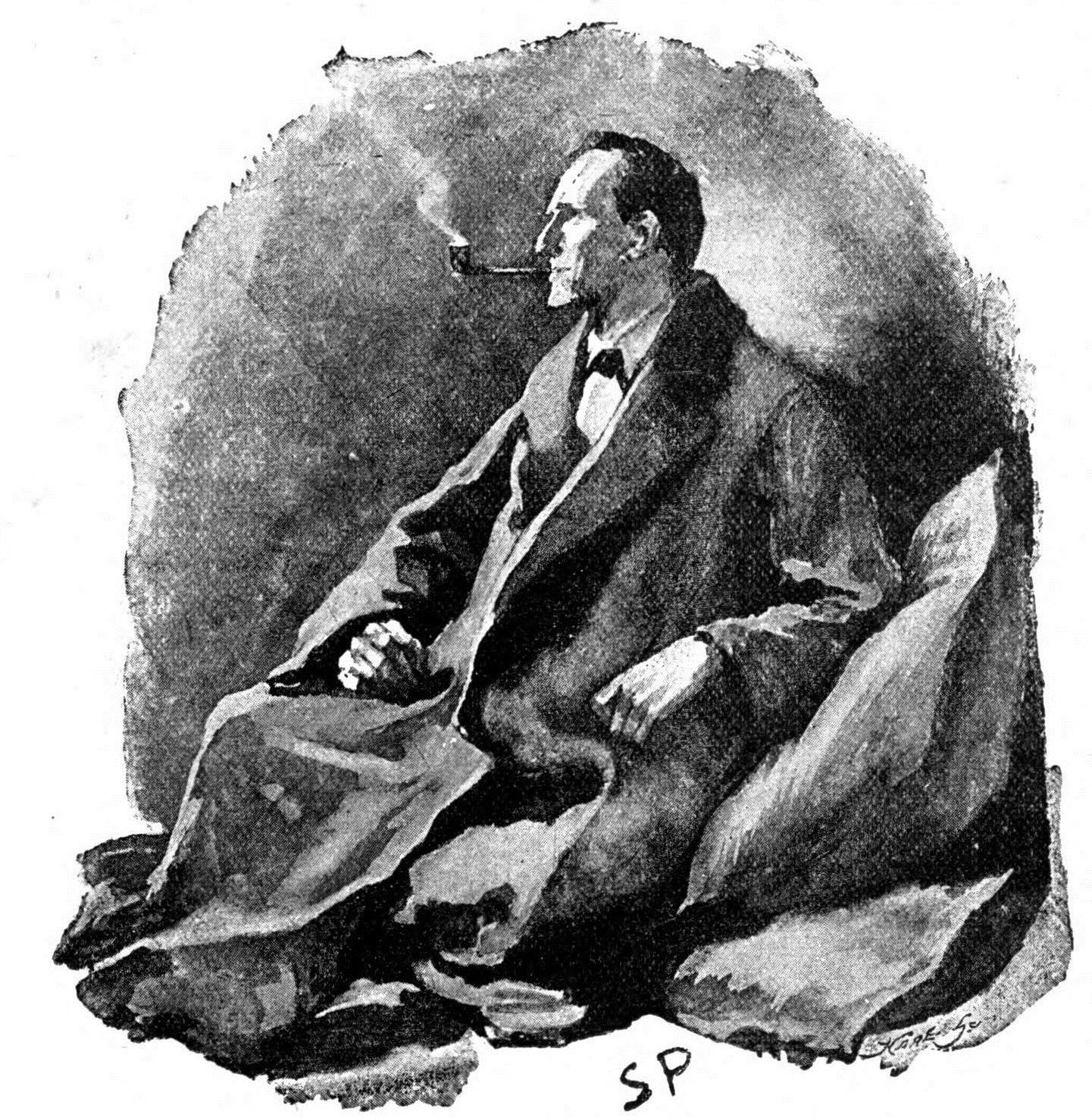
Sir Arthur Conan Doyle intentionally portrayed his character Sherlock Holmes as what would today be classified as asexual.

Asexual representation in media is limited and rarely openly acknowledged or confirmed by creators or authors. In works composed prior to the beginning of the twenty-first century, characters are generally automatically assumed to be sexual and the existence of a character's sexuality is usually never questioned. Sir Arthur Conan Doyle portrayed his character Sherlock Holmes as what would today be classified as asexual, with the intention to characterize him as solely driven by intellect and immune to the desires of the flesh. The Archie Comics character Jughead Jones was likely intended by his creators as an asexual foil to Archie's excessive heterosexuality, but, over the years, this portrayal shifted, with various iterations and reboots of the series implying that he is either gay or heterosexual. In 2016, he was confirmed to be asexual in the New Riverdale Jughead comics. The writers of the 2017 television show Riverdale, based on the Archie comics, chose to depict Jughead as a heterosexual despite pleas from both fans and Jughead actor Cole Sprouse to retain Jughead's asexuality and allow the asexual community to be represented alongside the gay and bisexual communities, both represented in the show. This decision sparked conversations about deliberate asexual erasure in the media and its consequences, especially on younger viewers.

Asexuality also sees mention in the writings of pseudonymous LGBTQI+ activist Jennie June, with the term "Anaphrodite" being the one used to denote it. In her 1922 book, June estimated that this term applied to about 0,5% of the male population, with them having a "horror of women" and minds devoid of "hero-worship" or attraction to masculinity. June listed Herbert Spencer, St. Paul, Immanuel Kant, and Isaac Newton as examples of Anaphrodites. June also asserted that Anaphrodites, due to their lack of desires for the joys of courtship, were "compensated by Providence in the way of extra allotment of intellectual enjoyment". June surmised that Anaphroditism was a result of either an illness in childhood or a congenital thing.

Anthony Bogaert has classified Gilligan, the eponymous character of the 1960s television series Gilligan's Island, as asexual. Bogaert suggests that the producers of the show likely portrayed him in this way to make him more relatable to young male viewers of the show who had not yet reached puberty and had therefore presumably not yet experienced sexual desire. Gilligan's asexual nature also allowed the producers to orchestrate intentionally comedic situations in which Gilligan spurns the advances of attractive females. Films and television shows frequently feature attractive, but seemingly asexual, female characters who are "converted" to heterosexuality by the male protagonist by the end of the production. These unrealistic portrayals reflect a heterosexual male belief that all asexual women secretly desire men.

Asexuality as a sexual identity, rather than as a biological entity, became more widely discussed in the media in the beginning of the twenty-first century. The Fox Network series House represented an "asexual" couple in the episode "Better Half" (2012). However, this representation has been questioned by members of the asexual community, as the episode concluded that the man simply had a pituitary tumor that reduced his sex drive and the woman was only pretending to be asexual to please him, leading to controversy over the representation and a change.org petition for Fox Network to reconsider how it represents asexual characters in the future, stating it "represented asexuality very poorly by attributing it to both medical illness and deception". Other fictional asexual characters include SpongeBob and his best friend Patrick from SpongeBob SquarePants and Todd Chavez from BoJack Horseman, who is generally well-accepted by the asexual community as positive representation.

== See also ==
- Asociality – Lack of motivation to engage in social interaction
- Virginity – State of a person who has never engaged in sexual intercourse
- Antisexualism – Hostility towards sexuality
- List of people on the asexual spectrum
- Platonic love – Non-sexual love
- Sexless marriage – Marital union with little or no sexual activity between the spouses
- Sexual anorexia – Informal term for sexual aversion; a loss of "appetite" for romantic-sexual interaction
- Supernormal stimulus – Concept in biology and psychology; a form of non-sexual stimulus, as opposed to libido
- Hypersexuality – Excessive arousal and interest in sex
- Timeline of asexual history
