= Anthony Bogaert =

Canadian psychologist

Anthony Francis Bogaert
- Born: 1963 (age 62–63)
- Education: University of Western Ontario
- Known for: Research into asexuality
- Scientific career
- Fields: Psychology
- Workplaces: Brock University
- Thesis: The Sexual Media: The Role Of Individual Differences (1993)

Anthony Francis "Tony" Bogaert is a Canadian psychologist, sex researcher, and academic specializing in human sexuality.

Bogaert is known for his research on asexuality and for helping establish asexuality as a subject of empirical academic study.

== Education ==
Bogaert completed his doctoral studies in psychology at the University of Western Ontario, receiving a PhD in 1993. His dissertation examined individual psychological responses to sexual media and variations in sexual behavior.

== Academic career ==
After receiving his PhD, Bogaert did postdoctoral work at the University of Toronto and Queen's University. He then joined Brock University in Ontario, Canada as a faculty member in Psychology and later held appointments in both the Department of Psychology and the Department of Health Sciences.

Bogaert has taught university courses in human sexuality and psychology for over 35 years.

Bogaert’s research has focused on human sexuality from psychological, biological, and sociocultural perspectives. He has supervised undergraduate and graduate students and contributed to interdisciplinary scholarship in psychology, sexuality studies, and public health.

Bogaert’s publications have appeared in journals including The Journal of Sex Research, Archives of Sexual Behavior, Journal of Sex & Marital Therapy, Hormones and Behavior,Frontiers in Neuroendocrinology and Proceedings of the National Academy of Sciences.

== Research ==
=== Asexuality ===
Bogaert is most widely recognized for his research concerning asexuality.

In 2004, he published Asexuality: Prevalence and Associated Factors in a National Probability Sample in The Journal of Sex Research. Using a large-scale British population survey, the study estimated that approximately one percent of respondents did not experience sexual attraction to others.

The study is considered one of the earliest large-scale empirical investigations of asexuality and contributed to the recognition of asexuality within academic psychology and sexuality studies.

In subsequent publications, Bogaert argued that asexuality should be understood as a distinct sexual orientation characterized primarily by a lack of sexual attraction rather than celibacy or abstinence.

In 2012, he published Understanding Asexuality, one of the first academic monographs dedicated entirely to the subject. The book examined biological, psychological, and social dimensions of asexuality and is widely cited within sexuality studies scholarship.

=== Sexual orientation and developmental research ===
Bogaert has also conducted research on biological and developmental influences associated with sexual orientation. In collaboration with Ray Blanchard, he is known for studies examining the fraternal birth-order effect, which proposes that the probability of male homosexuality increases with the number of older biological brothers.

In collaboration with immunologists and other psychologists, Bogaert’s research has indicated that a prenatal biological mechanism specifically, a maternal immune response to a male specific protein may underlie the fraternal birth order effect related to sexual orientation.

Bogaert has additionally published research on personality traits and sexual orientation, including studies applying the HEXACO personality model to heterosexual, homosexual, bisexual, and asexual populations.

=== Other sexuality research ===
Bogaert was the first to publish work on pedophilia and its link to atypical handedness, suggesting a prenatal origin to pedophilia. This work has been replicated by other scholars, although some recent research has not replicated the original findings.

Along with co-author Lori Brotto, Bogaert developed a model of object of desire perceptions (Object of Desire Self-Consciousness theory). Bogaert and colleagues have shown evidence of gender differences in these perceptions and related sexual scripts, including as they relate to sexual fantasies and language.

== Selected publications ==
=== Books ===
- Bogaert, Anthony F. (2012-08-09). Understanding Asexuality. Bloomsbury Publishing PLC. ISBN 978-1-4422-0101-9.

=== Selected articles ===
- Bogaert, Anthony F.; Fisher, William A. (1995). "Predictors of University Men's Number of Sexual Partners" (PDF). The Journal of Sex Research. 32 (2): 119–130. doi:10.1080/00224499509551782. ISSN 0022-4499. JSTOR 3812964.
- Blanchard, R.; Bogaert, A. F. (January 1996). "Homosexuality in men and number of older brothers". The American Journal of Psychiatry. 153 (1): 27–31. doi:10.1176/ajp.153.1.27. ISSN 0002-953X. PMID 8540587.
- Bogaert, A. F. (2001). "Handedness, criminality, and sexual offending". Neuropsychologia. 39 (5): 465–469. doi:10.1016/s0028-3932(00)00134-2. ISSN 0028-3932. PMID 11254928.
- Bogaert, Anthony F.; Sadava, Stan (June 2002). "Adult attachment and sexual behavior". Personal Relationships. 9 (2): 191–204. doi:10.1111/1475-6811.00012.
- Bogaert, Anthony F. (August 2004). "Asexuality: Prevalence and associated factors in a national probability sample". The Journal of Sex Research. 41 (3): 279–287. doi:10.1080/00224490409552235. PMID 15497056.
- Bogaert, Anthony F. (September 2006). "Toward a Conceptual Understanding of Asexuality". Review of General Psychology. 10 (3): 241–250. doi:10.1037/1089-2680.10.3.241. ISSN 1089-2680.
- Bogaert, Anthony F. (11 July 2006). "Biological versus nonbiological older brothers and men's sexual orientation". Proceedings of the National Academy of Sciences of the United States of America. 103 (28): 10771–10774. doi:10.1073/pnas.0511152103. ISSN 0027-8424. PMC 1502306. PMID 16807297.
- Bogaert, Anthony F. (July 2008). "Menarche and father absence in a national probability sample". Journal of Biosocial Science. 40 (4): 623–636. doi:10.1017/S0021932007002386. ISSN 1469-7599. PMID 17761007.
- Bogaert, Anthony F. (2009). "Predicting the Timing of Coming Out in Gay and Bisexual Men From World Beliefs , Physical Attractiveness , and Childhood Gender Identity / Role 1". Journal of Applied Social Psychology. 39 (8): 1991-2019. doi:10.1111/j.1559-1816.2009.00513.x. S2CID 54713919.
- Bogaert, Anthony F.; Brotto, Lori A. (2014). "Object of desire self-consciousness theory". Journal of Sex & Marital Therapy. 40 (4): 323–338. doi:10.1080/0092623X.2012.756841. ISSN 1521-0715. PMID 23905711.
- Bogaert, Anthony F. (2015). "Asexuality: what it is and why it matters". Journal of Sex Research. 52 (4): 362–379. doi:10.1080/00224499.2015.1015713. ISSN 1559-8519. PMID 25897566.
- Bogaert, Anthony F. (April 2017). "What Asexuality Tells Us About Sexuality". Archives of Sexual Behavior. 46 (3): 629–630. doi:10.1007/s10508-016-0892-2. ISSN 1573-2800. PMID 27832370.
- Bogaert, Anthony F.; Skorska, Malvina N.; Wang, Chao; Gabrie, José; MacNeil, Adam J.; Hoffarth, Mark R.; VanderLaan, Doug P.; Zucker, Kenneth J.; Blanchard, Ray (9 January 2018). "Male homosexuality and maternal immune responsivity to the Y-linked protein NLGN4Y". Proceedings of the National Academy of Sciences of the United States of America. 115 (2): 302–306. Bibcode:2018PNAS..115..302B. doi:10.1073/pnas.1705895114. ISSN 1091-6490. PMC 5777026. PMID 29229842.
- Bogaert, Anthony F.; Ashton, Michael C.; Lee, Kibeom (October 2018). "Personality and Sexual Orientation: Extension to Asexuality and the HEXACO Model". Journal of Sex Research. 55 (8): 951–961. doi:10.1080/00224499.2017.1287844. ISSN 1559-8519. PMID 28276935.
- Bogaert, Anthony F.; Hernder, Jessie E.; Johnson, Jessica R. (January 2026). "Who "Feels Sexy" in the Google Books Corpus? Text-Mining Evidence for Gender Differences in Object of Desire Self-Consciousness". Archives of Sexual Behavior. 55 (1): 393–407. doi:10.1007/s10508-025-03362-5. ISSN 1573-2800. PMID 41566112.

== Media ==
Bogaert has had television network appearances on ABC, BBC, CBS, CBC, and CNN and appearances on international radio broadcasts such as NPR and BBC. His research findings have also been summarized in New Scientist, People magazine, The Atlantic, Cosmopolitan, Time magazine, The New York Times, and the Times of India.

== Awards ==
Bogaert has received a number of research awards, including a theory award from the Society for Scientific Study of Sex (SSSS).
