= Let's Talk About Love (novel) =

2018 novel by Claire Kann

- Author: Claire Kann
- Genre: Romance
- Publisher: Swoon Reads
- Publication date: January 23, 2018
- ISBN: 978-1250136121

Let's Talk About Love is a 2018 young adult novel by Claire Kann. It follows Alice, an asexual teenager, who finds love after a previous failed relationship.

== Plot ==
After her girlfriend Margot leaves her due to her disinterest in sex, Alice Johnston, a biromantic asexual college student, is unsure if she will ever find a partner. She then falls for Takumi, an allosexual boy, but is nervous about how he will react to her asexuality.

== Reception ==
Regarding the book's asexual representation, Publishers Weekly said that "asexual readers will appreciate the visibility" and that allosexual readers "will gain a better sense of what love without sex can look like."

Lambda Literary Review, a blog for the Lambda Literary Foundation, positively commented on the book's characters and its complex depiction of asexuality, involving combating stereotypes, discussing the broader asexual spectrum, and portraying the intersectional microaggressions Alice confronts as a Black queer woman.

The book was also reviewed by School Library Journal.

Let's Talk About Love was included in the 2019 Top Ten of the American Library Association Rainbow Book List. It was also a nominee for the 2018 Goodreads Choice Award for Young Adult Fiction.

== Scholarly analysis ==
The book is the subject to the scholarly article Theorizing Conscious Black Asexuality through Claire Kann’s Let’s Talk about Love by Brittney Miles that was published in Humanities in October 2019.
