= Asexual Visibility and Education Network =

Online community of asexual people

- Company type: 501(c)4
- Website type: Advocacy group Virtual community
- Available in: 16 languages
- Founded: March 10, 2001
- Headquarters: Oakland, California, U.S.
- Founder: David Jay
- Website: asexuality.org

The Asexual Visibility and Education Network (AVEN) is an online community founded in 2001 by David Jay and classed as a 501(c)4 non-profit since June 2022. By 2021, it had 135,539 members, according to Michael Doré, one of its members in the UK who works with their project team.

== Purpose ==
According to AVEN organization member Michael Doré, the main goals when starting the website were "building community and… legitimising asexuality as a sexual orientation."

AVEN serves simultaneously as an informational platform, a space to foster community, and as a forum for facilitating discussion.

== Impact ==
=== Academic understanding of asexuality ===
A study performed by Kristin S. Scherrer on asexual identity was published in 2008 that focused on analyzing survey responses from 102 individuals that identified themselves as asexual.

The participants for this study were found and recruited through AVEN's website. In addition to contributing to the ability to acquire the necessary participants, AVEN served to inform the responses given by participants. For example, when asked to describe what an asexual identity meant to them, 44% of respondents closely echoed the definition of asexuality as found on AVEN's website. One respondent referred directly to AVEN in response to this question. Scherrer's study continues to impact academic research as it has been cited by many other studies.

=== Hypoactive Sexual Desire Disorder (HSDD) and the DSM-5 ===
AVEN is responsible for the creation of the AVEN DSM Task Force. As the American Psychiatric Association began efforts to make revisions that would become the new Diagnostic and Statistical Manual of Mental Disorders (DSM-5), this task force sought to petition for changes regarding sexual desire disorders.

== Activities ==
AVEN at London Pride, 2022

AVEN provides a community forum where users post about their experiences surrounding asexuality. Founder David Jay says these spaces help people who are unsure of their sexuality by providing support so they understand themselves better and learn there are other people like them. The forums exist in many languages.

== Publication ==
AVEN publishes a newsletter called AVENues every four months. It collects content from the community and includes fiction, poetry, articles and also publishes discussion pieces from the forum.
