= David Jay =

American asexual activist (born 1982)

Dave Jay
- Jay in 2005
- Born: April 24, 1982 (age 44)
- Education: Wesleyan University
- Organization: Asexual Visibility and Education Network
- Known for: Asexual activist
- Movement: Asexuality

David Jay (born April 24, 1982) is an American asexual activist. Jay is the founder and webmaster of the Asexual Visibility and Education Network (AVEN), the most prolific and well-known of the various asexual communities established since the advent of the World Wide Web and social media.

== Activism ==
Frustrated with the lack of resources available regarding asexuality, Jay launched AVEN's website in 2001. Since then, he has taken a leading role in the asexuality movement, appearing on multiple television shows, and being featured heavily in Arts Engine's 2011 documentary (A)sexual.

AVEN, which Salon.com referred to as the "unofficial online headquarters" of the asexuality movement, is widely recognised as the largest online asexual community. Its two main goals are to create public acceptance and discussion about asexuality and to facilitate the growth of a large online asexual community. As of June 17, 2013, AVEN has nearly 70,000 registered members.

In New York City, working both with the Department of Education and private organizations, he has been providing training on Ace (asexual) inclusion to health educators.

== Personal life ==
Jay is from St. Louis, Missouri, and he graduated from Crossroads College Preparatory School in 2000. At the age of 15, Jay began considering himself asexual, and he came out as asexual while a student at Wesleyan University in Connecticut.

Jay is part of a nonromantic, three-parent family, which he views as influenced by his asexual identity.

== Writing ==
In 2024, David Jay published a book on relationships titled Relationality: How Moving From Transactional to Transformational Relationships can Reshape Our Lonely World.
