= After Marriage: Rethinking Marital Relationships =

2016 book edited by Elizabeth Brake

- Language: English
- Subject: criticism of marriage
- Publisher: Oxford University Press
- Publication date: 2016
- Media type: Print
- Pages: 247
- ISBN: 9780190205089
- Website: https://academic.oup.com/book/6597

After Marriage: Rethinking Marital Relationships is a 2016 book edited by Elizabeth Brake in which the authors provide a philosophical investigation of marriage.

== Reception ==
The book was reviewed by Raja Halwani, Mara Marin and James Ryerson.

== Essays ==
1. Liberal Neutrality and Civil Marriage, Simon Căbulea May
2. Is Civil Marriage Illiberal?, Ralph Wedgwood
3. The Limitations of Contract: Regulating Personal Relationships in a Marriage-Free State, Clare Chambers
4. Is Marriage Bad for Children? Rethinking the Connection Between Having Children, Romantic Love, and Marriage, Samantha Brennan and Bill Cameron
5. Equality and Non-hierarchy in Marriage: What Do Feminists Really Want?, Elizabeth Brake
6. Liberty and Polygamy, Peter de Marneffe
7. Polygamy, Privacy, and Equality, Laurie Shrage
8. Temporary Marriage, Daniel Nolan
9. The (Dis)value of Commitment to One's Spouse, Anca Gheaus
