= GamesBids =

Canadian news website

- Available in: English
- Headquarters: Toronto, Ontario, {{{location_country}}}
- Founder: Robert Livingstone
- Website: www.gamesbids.com
- Launched: July 27, 1998

GamesBids.com launched July 27, 1998 as Torontosummergames.com, and was published to follow the bid by the city of Toronto to organize the Games of the XXIXth Olympiad in 2008. After Beijing was eventually elected to host the Olympic Games, the site continued to operate, generally addressing and analysing the overall Olympic bid business. Having launched in 1998, GamesBids.com was on the leading edge of publishing original news online. The site has been the source of some key exclusives including the leaking of the official Beijing 2008 Olympic Games logo and providing information before it was due to be released to the public. The logo was leaked ahead of a planned unveiling of the coveted brand that had been delayed by the SARS epidemic, and the website received international criticism for the publication.

Many international websites, newspapers, and news stations have mentioned Gamesbids in connection to the Olympic Movement, for instance the International Herald Tribune and The New York Times that wrote "GamesBids.com, an influential, independent Web site based in Canada that looks at the business of the bidding process."

As an English-language publication, GamesBids.com is frequently referenced as a key source by mainstream and specialty media across the United States and Canada and was particularly influential during campaigns by Chicago to host the 2016 Games and New York to host in 2012. In 2020, GamesBids.com created headlines across India when it received official clarification from the International Olympic Committee that India remained in the running for the 2032 Olympics after the IOC Vice President said the nation was out of the running.

GamesBids.com is also well-respected by key industry insiders. Baku 2020 Olympic bid chief Konul Nurullayeva said "GamesBids is one of the most influential websites that disseminate information about the preparation for the Olympics, the election process and the candidate-cities."

Olympics critic, activist and author Helen Lenskyj wrote that GamesBids.com is "a good source for bid committees but of limited use to critics" in her book Lenskyj, Helen Jefferson (15 April 2020). The Olympic Games A Critical Approach. p. 25. ISBN 9781838677732.. GamesBids.com however regularly covers Olympic Games and events live and on-site and is used as a source for other publications that are not on the scene. In 2015 GamesBids.com provided exclusive coverage of the Tibetan protests of the Beijing 2022 Olympic Games bid in Lausanne The website is referenced by Olympic authors and textbooks.

In 2010 GamesBids.com became one of the first web-only publications to receive official Olympic Games accreditation, to cover the Vancouver 2010 Olympic Winter Games. Such access had only been typically granted to print or broadcast media outlets. In 2013 GamesBids.com was given a rare accreditation to report from Turkmenistan, a country that does not issue journalist visas GamesBids.com has interviewed many prominent figures connected with sport, politics and royalty. In 2019 the website had a rare exclusive interview with Princess Victoria and Prince Daniel of Sweden during the Stockholm 2026 Olympic bid campaign.

== Awards and nominations ==
In 2015, GamesBids.com was nominated for an inaugural International Sports Press Association Sport Media Pearl Award in the category of "Journalistic Weblog". In 2018, GamesBids.com was ranked first in North and South America.

Year	Award	Category	Journalist	Result
2015	AIPS Sport Media Pearl Awards	Best Journalistic Weblog	Robert Livingstone	Shortlisted
2018	AIPS Sport Media Awards	Best Journalistic Weblog	Robert Livingstone	5th
2021	AIPS Sport Media Awards	Best Column	Robert Livingstone	Shortlisted

== BidIndex ==
The site publishes and regularly updates the BidIndex, an Olympic bid rating system in which the relative strength of the different bids and their chances of succeeding is measured. The BidIndex was correct when it predicted Beijing, though wrong with Vancouver, London and Sochi. The prediction model is further enhanced after each bid. BidIndex has accurately predicted the last four elected host cities, including Rio de Janeiro for the 2016 Summer Olympics, Pyeongchang for the 2018 Winter Olympics, Tokyo for the 2020 Summer Olympics and Beijing for the 2022 Winter Olympics.

=== 2022 BidIndex ===
BidIndex for the 2022 Winter Olympics, which normally is issued during the early days of the application phase, have been delayed due to the volatility of the field of contestants. It was eventually announced on 21 July 2015, ten days before the host city election.

Date	Almaty	Beijing
21 Jul 2015	56.44	57.01

=== BidIndex History ===
Cities are sorted by final BidIndex score for each Games. Only cities who progressed to the voting stage are shown. The final BidIndex scores are published before the election night, and therefore does not take into account factors such as the quality of each candidate city's final presentations.

Games	City	Final BidIndex Score	Voting Outcome	R1	R2	R3	R4
2022 Winter Olympics	Beijing	57.01	Won	45			
2022 Winter Olympics	Almaty	56.44	Eliminated in Round 1	40			
2020 Summer Olympics	Tokyo	62.14	Won	42	-	60	
2020 Summer Olympics	Istanbul	61.45	Eliminated in Round 3	26	49	36	
2020 Summer Olympics	Madrid	58.76	Eliminated in Round 2	26	45	-	
2018 Winter Olympics	Pyeongchang	66.17	Won	63			
2018 Winter Olympics	Munich	65.83	Eliminated in Round 1	25			
2018 Winter Olympics	Annecy	54.86	Eliminated in Round 1	7			
2016 Summer Olympics	Rio de Janeiro	61.42	Won	26	46	66	
2016 Summer Olympics	Chicago	61.24	Eliminated in Round 1	18	-	-	
2016 Summer Olympics	Tokyo	59.02	Eliminated in Round 2	22	20	-	
2016 Summer Olympics	Madrid	57.80	Eliminated in Round 3	28	29	32	
2014 Winter Olympics	Pyeongchang	64.99	Eliminated in Round 2	36	47		
2014 Winter Olympics	Sochi	63.17	Won	34	51		
2014 Winter Olympics	Salzburg	62.62	Eliminated in Round 1	25	-		
2012 Summer Olympics	Paris	66.18	Eliminated in Round 4	21	25	33	50
2012 Summer Olympics	London	65.07	Won	22	27	39	54
2012 Summer Olympics	Madrid	61.22	Eliminated in Round 3	20	32	31	-
2012 Summer Olympics	New York	57.59	Eliminated in Round 2	19	16	-	-
2012 Summer Olympics	Moscow	49.58	Eliminated in Round 1	15	-	-	-
2010 Winter Olympics	Salzburg	66.82	Eliminated in Round 1	16	-		
2010 Winter Olympics	Vancouver	65.31	Won	40	56		
2010 Winter Olympics	Pyeongchang	60.05	Eliminated in Round 2	51	53		
2008 Summer Olympics	Beijing	75.44	Won	44	56		
2008 Summer Olympics	Toronto	63.79	Eliminated in Round 2	20	22		
2008 Summer Olympics	Paris	58.71	Eliminated in Round 2	15	18		
2008 Summer Olympics	Istanbul	53.94	Eliminated in Round 2	17	9		
2008 Summer Olympics	Osaka	53.81	Eliminated in Round 1	6	-		

== Past Olympic Host Election Results ==
GamesBids has curated and publishes a comprehensive list of past Olympic Host election results that documents bid cities, IOC Sessions, locations and dates of elections, round-by-round vote counts and other notes for all past Olympic Games, Olympic Winter Games and Youth Olympic Games. This information is not compiled elsewhere, including on the International Olympic Committee website.

== Founding ==
GamesBids.com was founded in 1998 as an Olympic bid news and information web site created in Toronto, Ontario, Canada, by Robert Livingstone.
