= Criticism of LGBT =

Criticism of LGBT may refer to:

- Criticism of LGBT culture
- Criticism of LGBT pride
- Acephobia
- Anti-gender movement
- Arophobia
- Biphobia
- Gayphobia
- Heterosexism
- Homophobia
- Discrimination against lesbians
- Discrimination against non-binary people
- Transphobia
  - Transmisogyny

== See also ==
- Violence against LGBTQ people
- Gay bashing
