= Compulsory heterosexuality =

Social vision of heterosexuality as the natural inclination or obligation

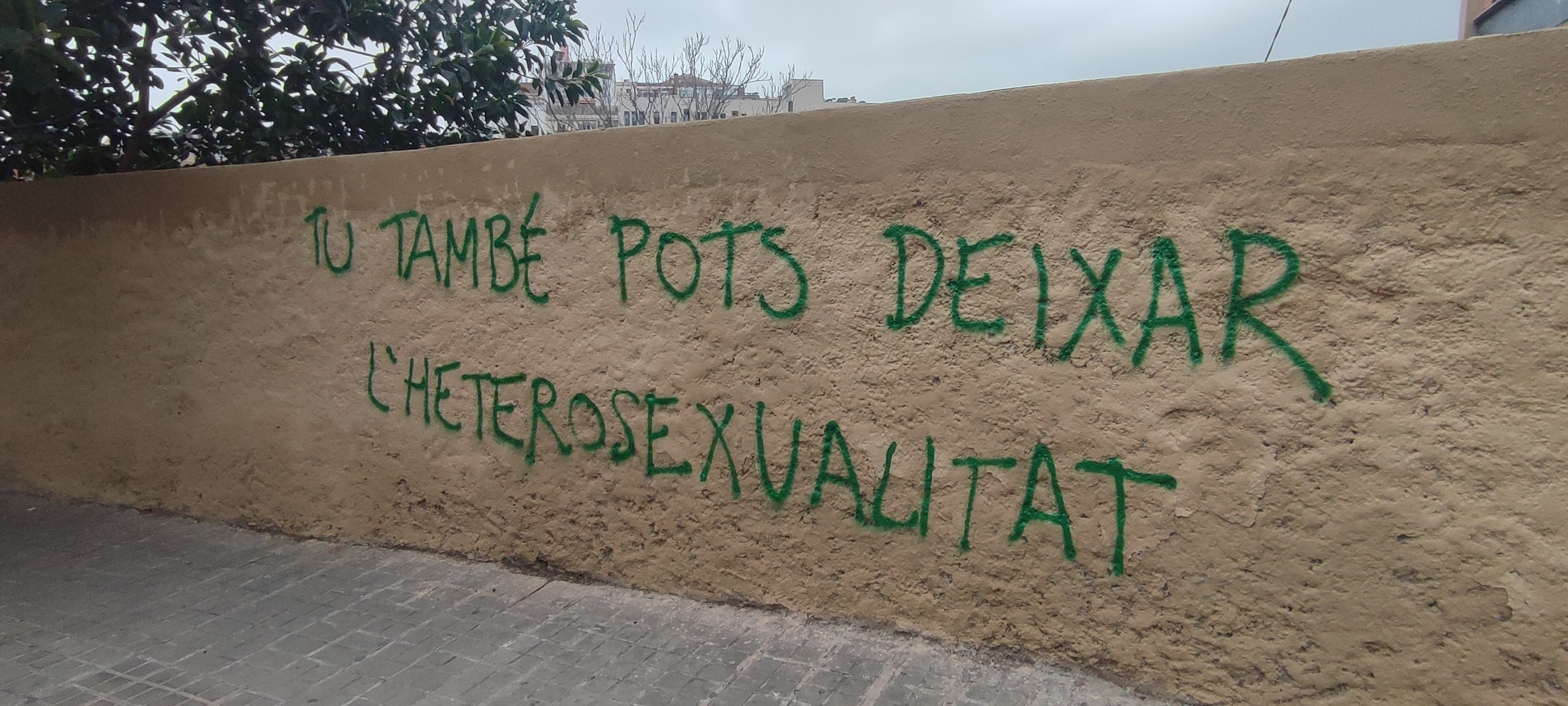
Catalan-language graffiti in Vallcarca i els Penitents (Barcelona) against comphet. It says: "You too can quit heterosexuality."

Compulsory heterosexuality, often shortened to comphet, is the theory that heterosexuality is assumed and enforced upon people by a patriarchal, allonormative, and heteronormative society. The term was popularized by Adrienne Rich in her 1980 essay titled "Compulsory Heterosexuality and Lesbian Existence". According to Rich, social science and literature perpetuate the societal belief that women in every culture are believed to have an innate preference for romantic and sexual relationships with men. She argues that women's sexuality towards men is not always natural but is societally ingrained and scripted into women. Comphet describes the belief that society is overwhelmingly heterosexual and delegitimizes queer identities. As a result, it perpetuates homophobia and legal inequity for the LGBTQ+ community.

== Concept and terminology ==
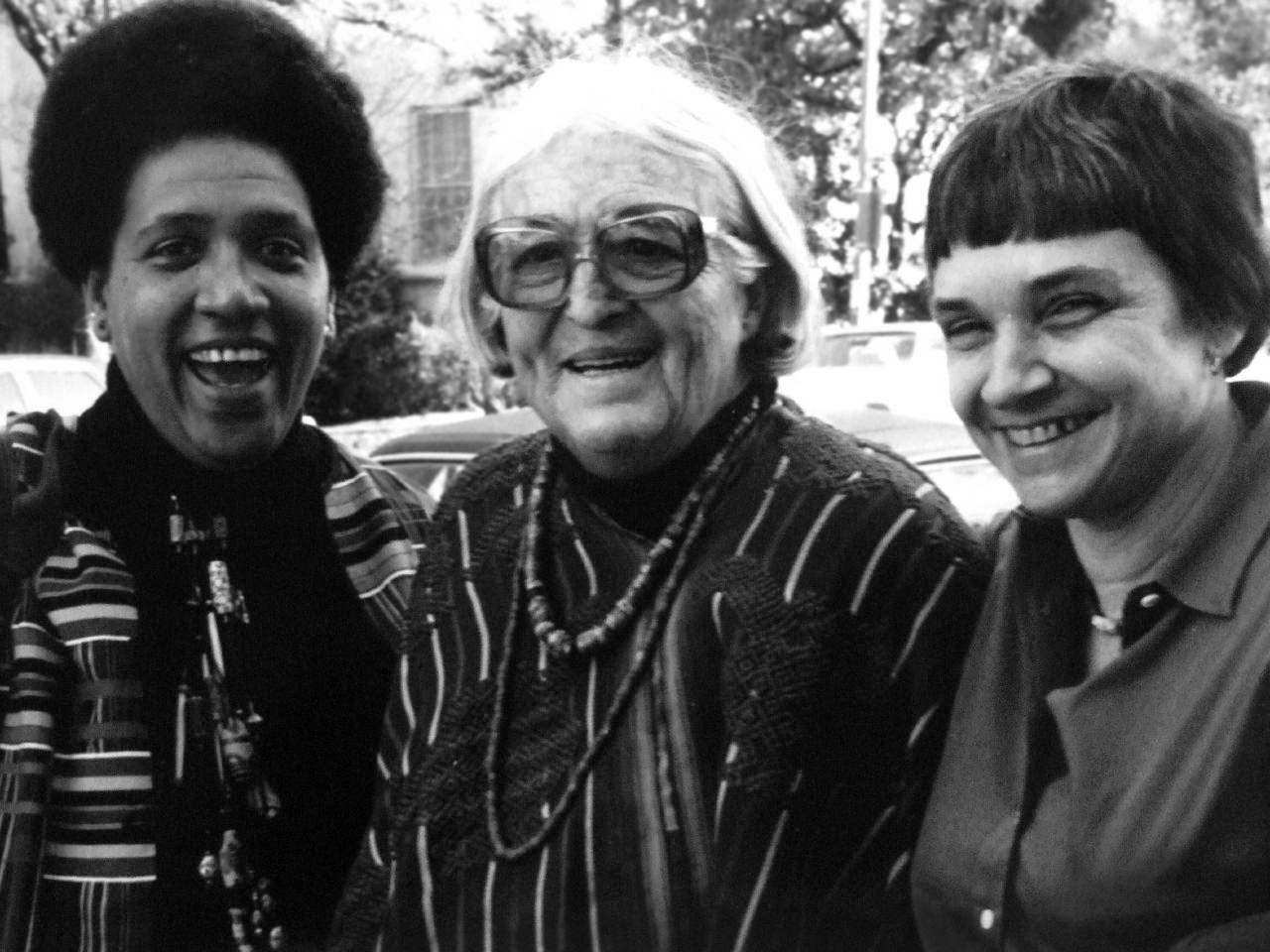
Adrienne Rich (right), who popularized the concept, in 1980

Adrienne Rich argued that heterosexuality is not natural or intrinsic to humans but is a political institution that supports the patriarchal domination of men over women in society, and feminist literature still functions under a heterosexual paradigm. She believes that feminist authors do not adequately acknowledge that institutions such as marriage are merely socializations that have been internalized and reproduced in society. This institution defines the standards for sexual and romantic relationships and alienates those outside these standards.

Rich originally wrote this essay to challenge lesbian erasure in the majority of feminist literature. She says the article was not written to ostracize or widen divides, but as a call to action for heterosexual feminists to look upon heterosexuality as an oppressive political institution and to help dismantle and change it. She urges these women to direct their attention towards other women and says that lesbian existence is a natural extension of feminism.

Rich introduces the term "lesbian existence" as an alternative to "lesbianism" and defines it not only as a sexual identity but as a concept and descriptor for living life in a way that consciously defies patriarchal society. The terminology of lesbian existence implies the historical, current, and future presence of lesbians. Paired with this term is the concept of the "lesbian continuum" as a way to broaden the lesbian existence to include female friendship, camaraderie, and any other type of emotionally intimate relationship between women. The term "lesbian" limits these intimate relationships to only romantic or sexual ones, thus limiting the term "erotic". The term lesbian continuum expands into Audre Lorde's definition of eroticism.

Lorde's definition of the erotic removes it from the sexual context in which it has been placed and brings it closer to the origins of the word eros, love in all its aspects. Her definition states that the erotic is women's capacity to feel overwhelming joy when they tap into their innermost desires, using their creative energy, sharing a deeper connection with others, and doing what feels innately right. The full experience of eroticism is dangerous to the patriarchy because women will search for fulfillment in all aspects of their lives once they understand the full capacity of joy they can experience. It would break the prioritization of men's desires.

Compulsory heterosexuality is viewed as an institution that acts upon people from birth, and thus, people are assumed to be heterosexual until proven otherwise. Due to this, Sandra Lipsitz Bem argues that sexual minorities have a greater "global identity development" from people investigating their experiences and senses of self in contrast to society. Those with minority sexual orientations are found to consider their sexual orientation as integral to their relationships with other people and as a foundation for their overall identity.

Katerina Deliovsky argues that the Western structure not only compels women's sexuality towards the opposite sex but also to the same race, adjusting the term to compulsory "white" heterosexuality. This is prevalent in the stereotypes of black men being aggressive or Asian men being feminine in media. She argues that when Rich says compulsory heterosexuality is structurally assuring men's rights or needs it is really assuring for white men. The origins of upholding comphet is not only for the comfort of men but also to maintain whiteness societally and institutionally, as can be seen in how interracial marriage was illegal. It isn't to say, though, that only white men are the ones maintaining this. White women are complicit in assisting the racist system that is beneficial to them.

== Factors ==
=== Manifestations of male power ===
The idea states that male dominance in a patriarchal society is a major factor in enforcing compulsory female heterosexuality; that, in order to serve men's needs, heterosexuality requires men to force women into heterosexual relationships and marriage under a patriarchal society. Kathleen Gough argues that there are eight characteristics of "male power in archaic and contemporary societies", which are:

1. Rejecting women's sexuality
2. Forcing male sexuality upon women
3. Exploiting women's labor
4. Controlling or robbing women of their children
5. Confining women physically
6. Using women as objects for male transactions
7. Denying women their creativity
8. Denying women from knowledge and cultural attainments

These characteristics combined create a culture in which women are convinced that heterosexuality and heterosexual relationships are inevitable by "control of consciousness", particularly when used in conjunction with lesbian erasure.

Heterosexuality is used to make women dependent on men for their wants and needs. The Radical Lesbians argued that heterosexual orientations can only exist under a society in which male domination exists, and that for self-realization women must uplift each other rather than being complacent in oppression by men. Female heterosexuality may also exist under a guise of seeking access to power through men rather than sexual attraction, as male socialization conflates power and dominance with sexual attraction. Author Victoria Brownworth has also written that the removal of lesbians and lesbian sexuality from history "is similar to the erasure of all autonomous female sexuality: women's sexual desire has always been viewed, discussed and portrayed within the construct and purview of the male gaze".

=== Lesbian erasure ===
There was an exclusion of lesbian identities as a viable and natural option for women in feminist literature in Rich's time. She believes that feminist literature assumes that women are "innately sexually oriented" for heterosexuality and that lesbian identities are formed out of backlash towards men rather than a valid identity in itself, as well as feminist literature not adequately examining compulsory heterosexuality and whether or not women would choose heterosexuality if the society were not patriarchal.

Lesbian erasure can also be considered a healthcare issue. As doctors assume that all patients are heterosexual, the answer to the question "Are you sexually active?" is followed by questions about birth control methods and such heterosexual-oriented questions without considering that the sexual orientation of the female patient may not be heterosexual. A healthcare provider who is unaware of a patient's sexual orientation can lead to missing or improperly treating medical problems in non-heterosexual patients.

People in lesbian relationships also have a difficult time obtaining fertility services and many lesbians are worried about discrimination and confidentiality when in a medical setting. Abuse in lesbian relationships is often overlooked by health professionals due to preconceived notions about women's 'temperaments' stemming from the gender binary. In these instances, it can stem from internalized homophobia or religious shame and stigmatization. Lesbians have experiences with therapists who do not believe that they are being abused by a woman or the therapist is only equipped to handle abuse in heterosexual relationships.

In a study on healthcare for lesbians of various ethnicities, a question about disclosing their sexuality to medical professionals was asked. All groups said it was important that healthcare providers knew their patients' sexuality, but some expressed hesitation in disclosing that information. API participants expressed possible discomfort disclosing their sexuality to healthcare providers of the same ethnicity because they might know someone in their family and share that, or be generally uncomfortable with their sexuality. Ultimately, all groups preferred a medical provider of the same ethnicity so they would be able to identify with them and the care they need regardless of sexuality.

It is suggested that women outside of standard relationships, such as lesbian and bisexual women, are best able to see the confines that heterosexuality imposes because they are not as adjusted to the inequality within heterosexual relationships, and that heterosexual women are confined to believing that heterosexuality is the only option.

=== In media ===
Lisa M. Diamond's piece, "'I'm Straight, but I Kissed a Girl': The Trouble with American Media Representations of Female–Female Sexuality", deconstructs the tropes of lesbian relationships in media, which tend to be inaccurate or offensive. She also brings up the criticisms of stereotypical lesbian characters, stating that audience members tend to want more authenticity within female relationships.

There are many movies and television shows that handle the topic of not only compulsory heterosexuality but also heteronormativity. A popular movie example is the 1999 movie But I'm a Cheerleader, whose director, Jamie Babbit, has confirmed that comphet and heteronormativity are themes that inspired this film.

=== Evolutionary theory ===
A major drive for compulsory heterosexuality is that of evolution, tying a sexual orientation's worth with reproduction. Evolutionarily speaking, in order to further the species, offspring must be created, and therefore genes are passed on. This basic understanding of biology is then taken steps further, implicating heterosexuality as the "natural" form and therefore making homosexuality specifically, as well as any minority sexuality, "abnormal". As Seidman puts it, science is "a powerful practical-moral force".

Though evolutionary arguments have implications for minority sexualities, they also directly impact the stereotypes of heterosexual relationships and especially masculinity concepts. Arguments for men being the hunter are then applied to today's understanding of the male gender being superior. The hunter/gatherer dichotomy is also placed on the female gender, with them being depicted as the weaker sex and their main function being childbearing and rearing.

A problem raised about using animals as a model by many psychologists is the scientific bias in researchers. Scientists often conduct studies through their cultural lens, applying their own narratives, often unconsciously, onto the animal. For example, researchers wanted to test the difference in "aggression" of female rats after their levels of androgen (hormones produced mainly, but not exclusively, in the testes) were increased. It was concluded that androgen is solely responsible for fighting and mounting traits, thus meaning that men have more aggressive traits because they are born with more androgen. This study was used as a model for differences in social behaviors between men and women, reinforcing the patriarchal rule that men are dominant. What it did not account for, though, is that when estrogen is increased in male and female rats, the same behaviors are increased. It also turns out that androgen is turned into estrogen to produce these behaviors and can only be blocked by antiestrogens, not antiandrogens. The final issue with this study is that aggression is a biased description for fighting behaviors, applying a human behavioral pretext.

=== Religion ===
Much of religion invokes a binary model for sexuality, for example, the Bible's inclusion of Adam and Eve as the beginning of humanity. Other examples include specific texts such as this one from Leviticus, "Thou shalt not lie with mankind, as with womankind: it is an abomination." Religious institutions throughout history have had strict moral guidelines when it came to marriage and what is deemed acceptable in the eyes of God. This directly translates to compulsory heterosexuality in society through the influence of leaders of the church, as well as in devout followers of this belief. As a result, homosexuals have a difficult time finding acceptance, particularly in the Bible Belt.

While a binary model for sexuality might be enforced, "Many of the Puritans in colonial New England believed that all human beings were filled with homosexual as well as heterosexual desire and that the good Christian should direct that desire into procreative sex within marriage." This ideology carries over in modern-day conservative Christianity and is enforced through the idea that the more welcoming people are to the idea of homosexuality, the more people will give in to their homosexual lusts. Author Alexis Leanna Henshaw agrees with this, suggesting that both religious beliefs and the government significantly affect societal attitudes about homosexuality by promoting beliefs that place anything relating to homosexuality in a negative light. Henshaw also mentions a hypothesis regarding the effects of religion and heteronormative policies. According to this article, empirical testing indicates that religious belief and heteronormativity in government policies have a significant relationship to levels of tolerance. University of Oklahoma Sociology professors Kara Snawder and Samuel Perry also claim that evidence from past studies shows that there is often a link between the religious beliefs of American citizens and homophobic behavior. According to these studies, the Abrahamic Religions, Islam, Judaism, and Christianity, all uphold heteronormative views on marriage.

Ruth Hubbard, a Harvard biologist, said that there is no natural human sexuality and that everything our society determines as sexual is channeled into a socially acceptable form of self-expression. Hubbard also writes that Western thinking about sexuality is "based on the Christian equation of sexuality with sin, which must be redeemed through making babies." She concludes that "to fulfil the Christian mandate, sexuality must be intended for procreation... all forms of sexual expression other than heterosexuality are invalidated."

=== Sexism in the labor force ===
Rich argues for compulsory heterosexuality in the workplace, to which end she references Catharine MacKinnon's Sexual Harassment of Working Women: A Case of Sex Discrimination. MacKinnon argues that women occupy low-paying jobs and their sexual marketability is a factor in the workplace. MacKinnon states that "her job depends on her pretending to be not merely heterosexual, but a heterosexual woman in terms of dressing and playing the feminine, deferential role required of 'real' women". Rich argues that the treatment of women in the workplace is a significant influence in society's compulsory heterosexuality. Rich argues that women feel pressure to be heterosexual in the workplace, and that this pressure is also present in society as a whole. As a species will become extinct if no reproduction occurs, and human women must be inseminated to produce offspring, heterosexual relationships are necessary for the survival of the human race, barring artificial insemination. According to Rich, women accept the male sex drive and regard themselves as sexual prey, and this influences compulsory heterosexuality. Furthermore, according to Rich, Barry argues for a "sexual domination perspective", claims that men subject women to what she terms as "sexual abuse" and "terrorism", and that the "sexual domination perspective" causes people to consider this "sexual abuse" and "terrorism" to be natural and inevitable and thus ignore it.

According to Rich, women believe men have a natural need to have sex, and this results in them viewing "abuse" as inevitable. Barry argues that this rationale is romanticized through popular media. Rich claims that this is reinforced through compulsory heterosexuality.

== In men ==
While the concept of compulsory heterosexuality initially only included women, later revisions of the idea have included discussion on how compulsory heterosexuality necessarily requires both men and women to reinforce the construct; ergo, that compulsory heterosexuality impacts males as well.

Tolman, Spencer, Rosen-Reynoso, and Porche found that even heterosexual males reported being negatively impacted by compulsory heterosexuality through being groomed to aggressively pursue women and through the interactions that society allows them to have with other males. In another article, entitled "In a Different Position: Conceptualizing Female Adolescent Sexuality Development Within Compulsory Heterosexuality", Tolman uses the term hegemonic masculinity to describe the set of norms and behaviors that dominate the social development of males. Moreover, hegemonic masculinity mirrors Rich's construct of compulsory heterosexuality by pointing out the social intuitions that demand specific behaviors from males; she says, "these norms demand that men deny most emotions, save for anger; be hard at all times and in all ways; engage in objectification of women and sex itself; and participate in the continuum of violence against women".

Compulsory heterosexuality also negatively affects gay and bisexual men by teaching them from a young age that straightness is "normal" and therefore anything that deviates from that is abnormal. Debbie Epstein discusses in her book, Silenced Sexualities in Schools and Universities, how heteronormative standards, as well as compulsory heterosexuality, lead not only to young males feeling forced to appear heterosexual, but can lead to violence against these males if they deviate from expectations against them. Helen Lenskyj has further suggested in her article "Combating homophobia in sport and physical education" that heterosexuality is enforced in males through intimidation and violence against those who deviate. Through these norms, males are taught from a young age that if they do not comply with heterosexual norms and standards, they place themselves at risk for social exclusion and physical violence against them.

== Intersectionality with other minority identities ==
To understand the complexity of compulsory heterosexuality, several scholars have pointed out the importance of the impact of this construct on the differential effects on all populations, including minorities. In "No More Secrets, No More Lies: African American History and Compulsory Heterosexuality", Mattie Udora Richardson discusses the additional complexities Black women face in terms of forced compulsory heterosexuality. Udora Richardson points out that, "Any divergences from the social norms of marriage, domesticity, and the nuclear family have brought serious accusations of savagery, pathology, and deviance upon Black people." She argues that, as a group that is already stigmatized in multiple ways, Black women face additional pressures from both the Black and White communities towards heteronormativity. Divergences from heterosexuality place Black women in particular risk of physical harm or social exile.

Audre Lorde says in Age, Race, Class and Sex: Women Redefining Difference "A fear of lesbians, or of being accused of being a lesbian, has led many Black women into testifying against themselves. It has led some of us into destructive alliances, and others into despair and isolation."

Author L. H. Stallings and her piece, "SBF seeks Miss Afrekete: Authenticity, erasure, and same-sex desire in the personals" documents the ways black lesbians often had to pursue other avenues to date or make friends as a result of discrimination in lesbian bars and spaces due to racist property owners. To fully understand the experience of lesbians, women of color must be included.

== Criticisms ==
Friction developed between members of the gay liberation and lesbian feminist movement due to the emphasis on sexual orientation politics through the lens of gender politics alone. Gay liberationists argued that the complexity of sexual orientation politics cannot be easily reduced to gender politics and that women are denied rights while gay and lesbian individuals are denied existence.

Gayle Rubin accused Rich's article of being part of a larger trend of sanitizing and romanticizing lesbianism that marginalizes actual lesbian sexuality.

The theory of compulsory heterosexuality is criticized for upholding the existence of a binary gendered system and strict roles under this binary system. This criticism states that compulsory heterosexuality ignores individuals who act outside of their prescribed gender roles and discounts individual agency in life.

Institutions such as Human Rights Campaign and Lambda Legal believe that compulsory heterosexuality is upheld by individuals and organizations, not society-wide beliefs. Therefore, as lesbian and gay visibility increases, compulsory heterosexuality decreases. As individual freedoms for sexual minorities increase, the institution of heterosexuality disappears.

== Influence ==
Rich believes that a woman is able to overcome compulsory heterosexuality by separating herself from men and entering a lesbian relationship to determine if heterosexuality is right for her. She argued that all women can be lesbians, regardless of sexual orientation, by identifying as a "woman-identified woman", meaning that the woman's focuses are on the needs and emotions of other women. The concept of compulsory heterosexuality and being able to reject this notion became a core component of the lesbian separatist movement that began in the 1970s and continued into the 1980s.

The creator of the theory of heteronormativity, Michael Warner, explicitly credits Rich's essay as inspiration for his theory, now considered one of the first major works of queer theory. Compulsory heterosexuality is also seen as a precursor to the development of the theory of heteronormativity, with the difference being that compulsory heterosexuality emphasizes the regulation of sexual expression in individuals. The concept has also been used within asexual studies to develop the theory of compulsory sexuality which argues that in addition to being subjected to the pressures of heterosexual conformity in a heteronormative society, individuals also face the assumption that everyone necessarily experiences sexual attraction unless they are "sick, dead, or lying", leading to the erasure of asexual identities.

== In popular culture ==
=== Music ===
In popular music, "Good Luck, Babe!" by Chappell Roan in 2024, talks about compulsory heterosexuality, with Roan describing a relationship with a woman who tries to deny her romantic feelings for Roan and women in general.

== See also ==
- Allonormativity
- Amatonormativity
- Biphobia
- Bisexual erasure
- Heteronationalism
- Heteronormativity
- Heterosexism
- Heterosociality
- Liberal homophobia
- Monosexism
