= Rafael Domingo =

Rafael Domingo may refer to:

- Rafael Santo Domingo, retired Major League Baseball pinch hitter
- Rafael Domingo Osle, Spanish jurist
