= Minimizing Marriage =

2012 book by Elizabeth Brake

Minimizing Marriage: Marriage, Morality, and the Law
- Author: Elizabeth Brake
- Language: English
- Subject: Criticism of marriage, philosophy of law
- Publisher: Oxford University Press
- Publication date: 2012
- Media type: Print (hardcover)
- Pages: 240
- ISBN: 9780199774142

Minimizing Marriage: Marriage, Morality, and the Law is a 2012 book by Elizabeth Brake in which the author provides an "in-depth examination of marriage, within the context of contemporary ethical and political theory."

== Reception ==
The book was reviewed in Ethics, Hypatia, Humana Mente – International Journal of Philosophical Studies, Notre Dame Philosophical Reviews, Philosophy in Review, Reason, Res Publica, Social Theory and Practice, Journal of Applied Philosophy, The Philosophers' Magazine, Journal of Homosexuality, and APhEx Portale Italiano di Filosofia Analitica Giornale di Filosofia.

== Cultural impact ==
In the book, Brake coined the term amatonormativity, defined as "the widespread assumption that everyone is better off in an exclusive, romantic, long-term coupled relationship, and that everyone is seeking such a relationship."

The concept has been particularly impactful for aromantic people, as Amatonormativity is said to be connected to devaluing familial, platonic, and queerplatonic friendships/relationships.
