= Allosexuality =

Person who experiences sexual attraction

- Pronunciation: /æloʊsɛkʃuælɪti/
- Etymology: From Greek prefix allo-, meaning "other", and -sexual, referring to sexual attraction
- Definition: The ability to experience sexual attraction (i.e., the opposite of asexuality)

Other terms
- Synonyms: Zedsexuality
- Associated terms: Alloromanticism (romantic attraction analogue)

Flag
- Allosexual flag Allosexual flag (rarely used)
- Flag name: Allosexual flag

Allosexuality is the ability to experience typical patterns of sexual attraction, in contrast with people on the asexual spectrum. For an individual who experiences sexual attraction, this identity is expressed as allosexual, sometimes shortened to allo; synonymous terms include zedsexual, or simply sexual.

The identity is general, and includes all the more specific identities of sexual attraction, such as heterosexual, homosexual, bisexual, or pansexual, among others. Allosexual identity does not imply any particular experiences, or frequency, of sexual attraction or sexual encounters.

Simplified diagram of the aromantic and asexual spectra

== Terminology ==
The prefix allo- comes from the Greek word Állos, meaning "other", "different", or "atypical". It was attached to the suffix 'sexual' to create a term meaning "a person who experiences sexual attraction towards others". The structure parallels other sexuality terms such as homosexual, heterosexual, bisexual, pansexual, asexual, etc.

== History ==
In a medicalized context, allosexual has been used in contrast to autosexual, thus describing sexual attraction towards others or sexual behavior between multiple people. The term was coined by the asexual community as a way to name and discuss the experiences of all types of non-asexual people. It is used to normalize asexuality and provide a term that can be used in conjunction with ace terminology, making asexuality just another sexuality among others, rather than being a deviation from what is simply 'normal' due to the relative proportions of the population who do, or do not, experience sexual attraction.

== Society and culture ==
A 2004 study of British residents found that men are more likely to be allosexual than women.

Asexuals are estimated to make up 1% or less of the total population and about 1.7% of the LGBT population. Since the majority of people would be classified as allosexual, it is viewed by some as the natural way of being and asexuality as a deviation from this norm. Physical intimacy is considered an essential part of romantic relationships among allosexuals, which can complicate relationships between asexual and allosexual individuals. Allonormativity, or the concept that all humans experience sexual attraction or desire a sexual relationship, can lead to the isolation and marginalization of asexual individuals.

== See also ==
- Allonormativity
- Analloeroticism
