= Glenn Reynolds =

Professor, writer, blogger (born 1960)

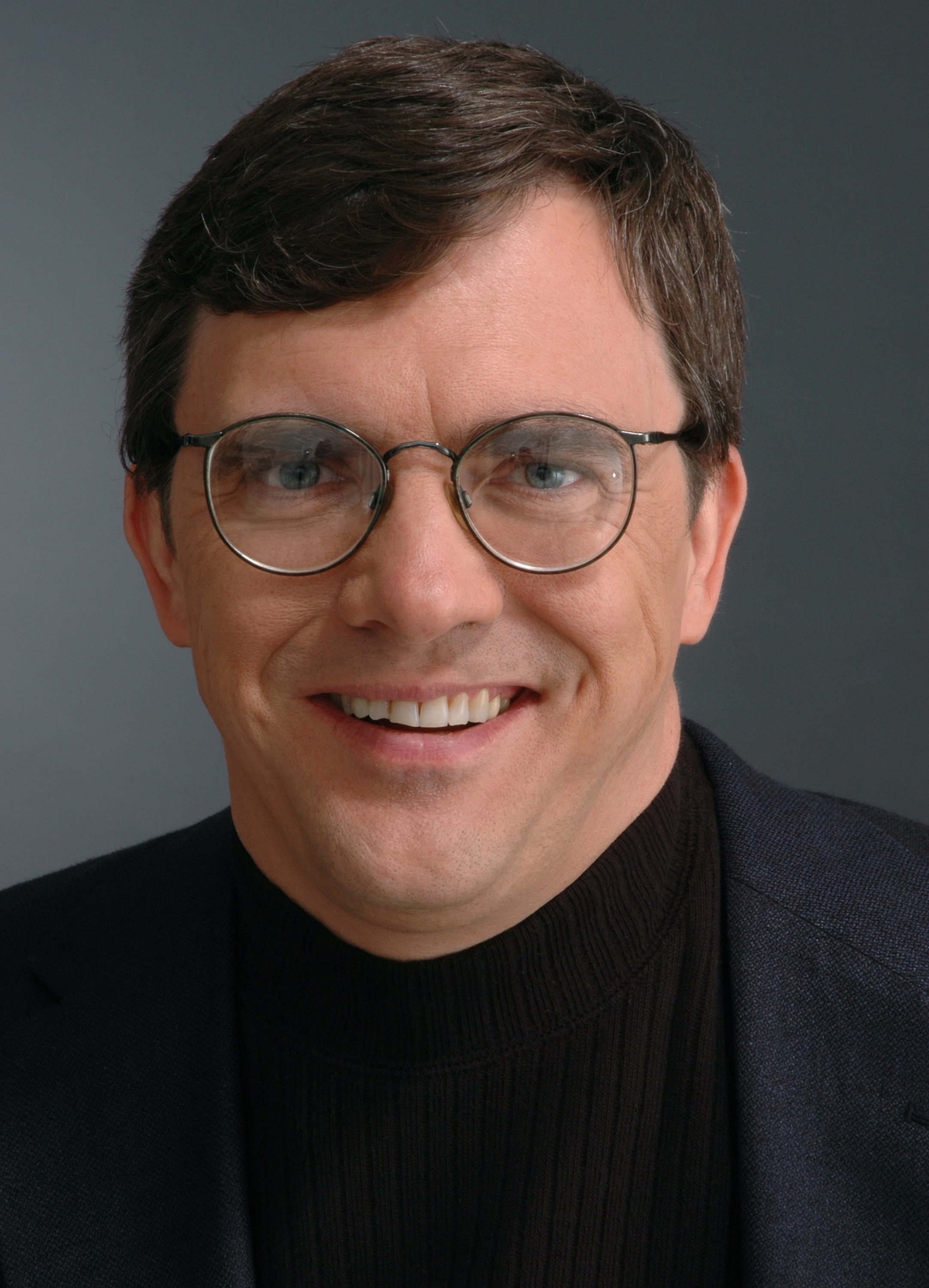
- Born: Glenn Harlan Reynolds; August 27, 1960 (age 66); Birmingham, Alabama, U.S.
- Education: University of Tennessee (BA); Yale University (JD)
- Occupations: Professor, writer, blogger
- Movement: Right-libertarianism
- Spouse: Helen Smith

Glenn Harlan Reynolds (born August 27, 1960) is an American legal scholar who is the Beauchamp Brogan Distinguished Professor of Law at the University of Tennessee College of Law. He is known for his American politics blog, Instapundit.

== Instapundit blog ==
Reynolds' blog began as a class project in August 2001, when he was teaching a class on Internet law. Much of Instapundit's content consists of links to other sites, often with brief comments.

The blog is multi-author, with numerous contributors.

In 2007 network theory researchers who studied blogs as a test case found that Instapundit was the #1 blog for "quickly know[ing] about important stories that propagate over the blogosphere".

In 2007, Reynolds called for the assassination of Iranian scientists and clerics.

On September 21, 2016, Reynolds suggested on Twitter that any drivers feeling threatened by protesters objecting to the fatal shooting of Keith Lamont Scott in Charlotte, North Carolina, should "run them down." The tweet consisted only of the words "Run them down" and a link to a news story about the protestors. The following day, Reynolds defended his tweet, saying, "I wouldn't actually aim for people blocking the road, but I wouldn't stop because I'd fear for my safety, as I think any reasonable person would."

Twitter suspended Reynolds' account, but restored it shortly after and told him to delete the tweet in order to be allowed to use Twitter again. The University of Tennessee said it was investigating Reynolds as it did not condone language encouraging violence, but on September 27, 2016, the law school decided that no disciplinary action would be taken. USA Today said that Reynolds had violated its standards and suspended his column for one month. Reynolds issued an apology at its request, writing, "I didn't live up to my own standards, and I didn't meet USA Today's standards".

== Political views ==
Reynolds is often described as conservative, but holds liberal views on some social issues (such as abortion, the war on drugs and gay marriage), a combination often described as libertarian. He illustrates his philosophy by stating: "I'd like to live in a world in which happily married gay people have closets full of assault weapons to protect their pot." He has been called libertarian.

He delivered the keynote speech at a September 2011 conference at the Harvard Law School to discuss a possible Second Constitution of the United States and concluded that the movement for a constitutional convention was a result of having "the worst political class in our country's history".

== Personal life ==
Born in Birmingham, Alabama in 1960, he graduated with a B.A. degree from the University of Tennessee in 1982 and with a J.D. degree from the Yale Law School in 1985. Reynolds is married to Dr. Helen Smith, a forensic psychologist.

Reynolds once ran his own music label WonderDog Records, for which he also served as a record producer. Reynolds has worked as an indie music artist. One of his albums reached the number one album chart spot on the website service MP3.com for several weeks.

Reynolds is of Scots-Irish ancestry.

== Other writing ==
=== Academic publications ===
As a law professor, Reynolds has written for the Columbia Law Review, the Virginia Law Review, the University of Pennsylvania Law Review, the Wisconsin Law Review, the Northwestern University Law Review, the Harvard Journal of Law & Technology, Law and Policy in International Business, Jurimetrics, and the High Technology Law Journal, among others.

=== Books ===
- Outer Space: Problems of Law and Policy (1989), ISBN 0-8133-7622-X (with Robert P. Merges); 2nd ed. (1997), ISBN 0-8133-1802-5
- The Appearance of Impropriety: How the Ethics Wars Have Undermined American Government, Business, and Society (1997), ISBN 0-684-82764-6 (with Peter W. Morgan)
- An Army of Davids: How Markets and Technology Empower Ordinary People to Beat Big Media, Big Government, and Other Goliaths (2006), ISBN 1-59555-054-2

Looks at modern American society through the lens of individuals versus social institutions, and Reynolds concludes that technological change has allowed more freedom of action for people, in contrast to the "big" establishment organizations that used to function as gatekeepers. Thus, he argues that the balance of power between individuals and institutions is "flatting out", which involves numerous decentralized networks rising up.

- The Higher Education Bubble (2012), ISBN 9781594036651

About the rising price of higher education, causing students to take on excessive debt, even as they face an uncertain job market. Higher education spending fueled by cheap credit resembles an economic bubble, and higher education bubble has become a common term to describe this phenomenon.

- The K-12 Implosion, Encounter Broadsides No. 31, (2013) ISBN 9781594036880

Provides a description of what Reynolds believes to be wrong with America's K-12 education system, and where the solutions are likely to come from, along with advice for parents, educators, and taxpayers. He argues that America has been putting ever-growing amounts of money into the existing public education system, while getting increasingly worse results. He suggests that while parents are losing hope in public schools, new alternatives are appearing, and change is inevitable.

=== Columns and articles ===
Reynolds also writes articles for various publications (generally under his full name, Glenn Harlan Reynolds): Wikipedia, Popular Mechanics, Forbes, The New York Post, The New York Times, The Atlantic Monthly, The Washington Post, The Washington Times, The Los Angeles Times, USA Today, and The Wall Street Journal. He has written for the TCS Daily, Fox News, and MSNBC websites as well.
