= John Witte Jr. =

Canadian-American academic

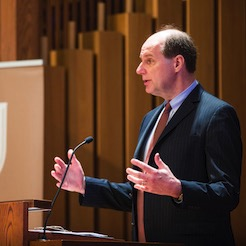
- Witte in 2017

Education
- Education: Calvin College; Harvard Law School

Philosophical work
- Institutions: Emory University School of Law
- Main interests: Marriage and family law; religion, human rights and religious freedom; law and religion; law and Christianity; legal history; legal and political theory
- Website: www.johnwittejr.com

John Witte Jr. is a Canadian-American academic. He is a Robert W. Woodruff University Professor and a McDonald Distinguished Professor at Emory University School of Law in Atlanta, Georgia, and is director of the Center for the Study of Law and Religion there.

He is series editor of the Emory University Studies in Law and Religion by Wm. B. Eerdmans Publishing, and general editor of the Law and Christianity Series published by Cambridge University Press. In 2022, he delivered the Gifford Lectures on A New Calvinist Reformation of Rights at the University of Aberdeen.

== Education ==
Witte received a B.A. from Calvin College in 1982, and a J.D. from Harvard Law School in 1985.

== Books ==
As author:

- Law and Protestantism: The Legal Teachings of the Lutheran Reformation (Cambridge University Press, 2002)
- Sex, Marriage and Family in John Calvin’s Geneva I: Courtship, Engagement and Marriage (with Robert M. Kingdon) (Wm. B. Eerdmans Publishing Co., 2005)
- God's Joust, God's Justice: Law and Religion in the Western Tradition (Wm. B. Eerdmans Publishing Co., 2006)
- The Reformation of Rights: Law, Religion, and Human Rights in Early Modern Calvinism (Cambridge University Press, 2007)
- The Sins of the Fathers: The Law and Theology of Illegitimacy Reconsidered (Cambridge University Press, 2009)
- Christianity and Human Rights: An Introduction (with Frank Alexander) (Cambridge University Press, 2010)
- No Establishment of Religion: America’s Original Contribution to Religious Liberty (with T. Jeremy Gunn) Oxford University Press, 2012)
- Religion and Human Rights: An Introduction (with M. Christian Green) (Oxford University Press, 2012)
- From Sacrament to Contract: Marriage, Religion, and Law in the Western Tradition, 2nd ed. (Westminster John Knox Press, 2012)
- The Western Case for Monogamy Over Polygamy (Cambridge University Press, 2015)
- Church, State, and Family: Reconciling Traditional Teachings and Modern Liberties (Cambridge University Press, 2019)
- Faith, Freedom, and Family: New Studies in Law and Religion (Mohr Siebeck, 2021) (edited by Norman Doe and Gary S. Hauk)
- The Blessings of Liberty: Human Rights and Religious Freedom in the Western Legal Tradition (Cambridge University Press, 2021)
- Religion and the American Constitutional Experiment, 5th ed. (with Joel A. Nichols and Richard W. Garnett) (Oxford University Press, 2022)
- In Defense of the Marital Family (Brill, 2023)
- Raíces protestantes del Derecho (Thomson Reuters Aranzadi, 2023)
- Table Talk: Short Talks on the Weightier Matters of Law and Religion (Brill, 2023) (Open Access)
- Le origini e il futuro della libertà religiosa in Europa e negli Stati Uniti (Milan/Bologna: Il Mulino, 2024) (with Andrea Pin)
- What Might Make Life Better? (Evangelische Verlagsanstalt: Leipzig, 2024) (with Michael Welker)

As editor:

- Herman Dooyeweerd, A Christian Theory of Social Institutions (Magnus Verbrugge, trans.) (Paideia Press, 1986)
- Christianity and Democracy in Global Context (Westview Press, 1993)
- Harold J. Berman, Law and Language: Effective Symbols of Community (Cambridge University Press, 2013)

As co-editor:

- The Weightier Matters of the Law: Essays on Law and Religion (with Frank S. Alexander) (American Academy of Religion Studies in Religion Series, 1988)
- Religious Human Rights in Global Perspective: Legal Perspectives (with Johan D. van der Vyver) (Martinus Nijhoff Publishers, 1996)
- Religious Human Rights in Global Perspective: Religious Perspectives (with Johan D. van der Vyver) (Martinus Nijhoff Publishers, 1996)
- Human Rights in Judaism: Cultural, Religious and Political Perspectives (with Michael J. Broyde) (Jason Aronson Publishers, 1998)
- Sharing the Book: Religious Perspectives on the Rights and Wrongs of Proselytism (with Richard C. Martin) (Orbis Books, 1999)
- Covenant Marriage in Comparative Perspective (with Eliza Ellison) (Wm. B. Eerdmans Publishing Co., 2005)
- Family Transformed: Religion, Values, and Family Life in Interdisciplinary Perspective (with Steven M. Tipton) (Georgetown University Press, 2005)
- Sex, Marriage, and Family in the World Religions (with Don S. Browning and M. Christian Green) (Columbia University Press, 2006)
- The Teachings of Modern Protestantism on Law, Politics and Human Nature (with Frank S. Alexander) (Columbia University Press, 2007)
- The Teachings of Modern Roman Catholicism on Law, Politics and Human Nature (with Frank S. Alexander) (Columbia University Press, 2007)
- The Equal Regard Family and Its Friendly Critics (with M. Christian Green and Amy Wheeler) (Wm. B. Eerdmans Publishing Co., 2007)
- To Have and to Hold: Marrying and its Documentation in Western Christendom, 400-1600 (with Philip L. Reynolds) (Cambridge University Press, 2007)
- The Teachings of Modern Orthodox Christianity on Law, Politics and Human Nature (with Frank S. Alexander) (Columbia University Press, 2007)
- Proselytism and Orthodoxy in Russia: The New War for Souls (with Michael Bourdeaux) (Orbis Books, 1999; repr. ed. Wipf & Stock Publishers, 2009)
- Christianity and Law: An Introduction (with Frank S. Alexander) (Cambridge University Press, 2008)
- Texts and Contexts in Legal History: Essays in Honour of Charles Donahue (with Sara McDougall and Anna di Robilant) (Robbins Collection, 2016)
- Christianity and Family Law: An Introduction (with Gary S. Hauk) (Cambridge University Press, 2017)
- The Protestant Reformation of the Church and the World (with Amy Wheeler) (Westminster John Knox Press, 2018)
- Christianity and Global Law (with Rafael Domingo Osle) (Routledge, 2020)
- Great Christian Jurists in German History (with Mathias Schmoeckel) (Mohr Siebeck, 2020)
- Christianity and Criminal Law (with Mark Hill, Norman Doe and R. H. Helmholtz) (Routledge and CRC Press, 2020)
- The Impact Series on Character Formation, Ethical Education, and the Communication of Values in Late Modern Pluralistic Societies, 10 volumes (with Michael Welker and others) (Evangelische Verlagsanstalt, 2020–23)
- The Oxford Handbook of Christianity and Law (with Rafael Domingo) (Oxford University Press, 2023)

== Personal life ==
Witte is married to Eliza Ellison, a theologian and mediator. They have two daughters and five grandchildren.
