= Helen Smith (psychologist) =

American psychologist

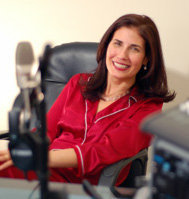
- Education: University of Tennessee (PhD)
- Occupation: Forensic psychologist
- Spouse: Glenn Reynolds
- Scientific career
- Thesis: Angry temperament and locus of control in young women with and without premenstrual syndrome (1994)

Helen Smith is an American forensic psychologist in Knoxville, Tennessee, who specializes in violent children and adults. She holds a Ph.D. from the University of Tennessee and master's degrees from The New School for Social Research and the City University of New York. She has written The Scarred Heart: Understanding and Identifying Kids Who Kill, and was writer and executive producer of Six, a documentary about the murder of a family in Tennessee by teens from Kentucky. The film highlights the inadequacies of the school, mental health and criminal justice systems in preventive treatment of troubled teens; the film was shown at a 2003 film festival in Tennessee.

More recently, Smith wrote Men on Strike: Why Men Are Boycotting Marriage, Fatherhood, and the American Dream - and Why It Matters. The National Review interviewed Smith about the book which was also discussed in the media, and within an op-ed piece in the Boston Globe. The Independent Women's Forum presents Smith as an example of a modern feminist, one who is also an advocate for men, and Smith's comments about the lack of support for men appeared in a 2017 article in The Public Eye. The Southern Poverty Law Center includes Smith in their information on men's rights activists.

== Selected publications ==
- Smith, Helen (2000). The scarred heart : understanding and identifying kids who kill. Knoxville, TN: Callisto Pub. ISBN 0-615-11223-4. OCLC 46852045.
- Smith, Helen (2013). Men on strike : why men are boycotting marriage, fatherhood, and the American dream--and why it matters. New York. ISBN 978-1-59403-675-0. OCLC 809615514.
- Smith, Helen (2026). His Side : Men Speak Out on Dating, Marriage, and Life in America. Brentwood, TN: Bombardier Books. ISBN 979-8895653586.

== See also ==
- Masculism
- Wendy McElroy
- Daphne Patai
