= Natasha Cornett =

American criminal

- Born: Natasha Leanne Wallen; January 26, 1979 (age 47); Betsy Layne, Kentucky, U.S.
- Convictions: First degree murder (3 counts); Attempted first degree murder Especially aggravated kidnapping (2 counts); Aggravated kidnapping (2 counts); Theft over $1,000
- Penalty: Life imprisonment without parole

Details
- Victims: Lillelid family
- Date: April 6, 1997
- Country: United States
- State: Tennessee
- Locations: Greene County, near Baileyton
- Killed: 3 (Vedar Lillelid, Delfina Lillelid, Tabitha Lillelid)
- Injured: 1 (Peter Lillelid)
- Weapon: Pistol
- Date apprehended: April 8, 1997
- Imprisoned at: Bledsoe County Correctional Complex

Natasha Leanne Cornett (née Wallen; born January 26, 1979) is an American convicted mass murderer currently serving a sentence of life without parole at the Bledsoe County Correctional Complex in Pikeville, Tennessee, for her involvement in the Lillelid murders.

In her book The Scarred Heart: Understanding and Identifying Kids Who Kill, forensic psychologist Helen Smith considers Natasha Cornett's troubled life as a warning of the failures of the school, mental health, and criminal justice systems in preventive treatment.

== Early life ==
Cornett was born into poverty in rural Pike County, located in Eastern Kentucky. She is of English, Scottish, Irish, Cornish, Dutch, German and Monacan descent. Cornett's mother, Madonna Wallen, was not married to her biological father, a local policeman named Roger Burgess with whom Madonna was having an affair. When Natasha was a toddler, Madonna left her husband, Ed Wallen, and raised Natasha alone in a ramshackle trailer located in the outskirts of Pikeville, Kentucky. It is believed Natasha received little or no parental support (financial or social) from either her biological father or Madonna's ex-husband, whose name had been entered on her birth certificate. According to Tennessee court records, she grew up with "the lack of a father figure, and an irresponsible mother". By junior high school, Cornett was alienated from most of her fellow pupils because of her unconventional behavior. She suffered from anorexia and was diagnosed with bipolar disorder, which went largely untreated due to lack of health insurance. By the time she entered high school, Cornett was being openly harassed and bullied by other students for her uncommon dress and conduct. Pleas for help by her were ignored by unsympathetic school authorities. Sometime during her freshman year of high school, Cornett dropped out.

Cornett married a long-time friend named Stephen Cornett on her 17th birthday, taking his surname. Natasha told Women's Entertainment Network interviewers in a 2009 documentary that when Stephen ended the marriage after about six months, she "caved in" emotionally and was psychologically devastated. She also indicated this failed relationship exacerbated her existing mental health problems.

By the time of her marriage, Cornett had firmly embraced the Goth subculture, wearing black clothing and listening to dark "doom-ridden music", as well as exhibiting interest in the occult and witchcraft. During this period, Cornett was abusing drugs and alcohol and practicing self-mutilation, all of which she had been doing since her early teen years. Young people who were similarly inclined were drawn to Cornett, and she became the informal leader of the group.

== Lillelid murders ==
On April 6, 1997, Cornett, then 18 years old, and five friends/fellow disaffected youths— Edward Dean Mullins, 19; Joseph Lance Risner, 20; Crystal Rena Sturgill, 18; Jason Blake Bryant, 14; and Karen Renae Howell, 17— took to the road in Risner's beat-up Chevrolet Citation. They were hoping to start new lives in New Orleans, Louisiana, where Cornett had spent a few weeks visiting with a friend following the end of her marriage. While the overarching reason for leaving was the desire of the group to escape what they saw as the stultifying boredom of life and dispiriting poverty they were experiencing in Pikeville, there was a more immediate motivation. The previous night (and not for the first time), Cornett had rented a room in a local economy lodging establishment, the Colley Motel (no longer in business), for the purposes of drinking and smoking marijuana. The party got out of hand, and the next day, fearing possible criminal charges for damages done to the room, the group thought it best to leave town.

Along the way, they met the Lillelid family at an interstate highway rest area in Greeneville, Tennessee: Norwegian-born Vidar Lillelid, 34; his Honduran-American wife Delfina, 28; their daughter Tabitha, 6; and son Peter, 2. The Lillelids were Jehovah's Witnesses, and they were dedicated to proselytizing their faith to others, including the young people they encountered at the rest area. Cornett and her friends wanted to steal the family's van, having already discussed possibly car-jacking a bigger and more dependable vehicle to replace their cramped and likely unreliable Citation.

At gunpoint, the family was forced back into their van and ordered to drive to a deserted road in nearby Baileyton, Tennessee, where they were shot execution-style by 14-year-old Jason Bryant and possibly other male members of the group; later court testimony differs on which other male members of the group participated in the shooting. After the shooting, the group abandoned their own vehicle and left in the Lillelid family's van. As a result of the murders, the group changed their plans, deciding to flee to Mexico instead of going to New Orleans. Soon after they drove off, police found Vidar and Delfina dead at the scene; Tabitha died after being transported to the hospital. Peter, who was found lying in a ditch, was the only survivor. He had been shot once in the torso and once through the eye. As a result of the shooting, he was left blind in one eye and permanently disabled.

Two days after the shootings, the six perpetrators in the Lillelid family's stolen van were taken into custody by U.S. Customs and Immigration officials in Arizona, having been ordered by Mexican police to return to the United States for entering Mexico without proper papers.

=== The trial ===
Cornett and the others were transported to Greeneville, Tennessee, where they were booked into the local county jail awaiting trial on charges of first-degree murder, attempted murder, and kidnapping.

Cornett accepted the volunteered pro bono legal services of attorney Eric Conn, a lawyer specializing in Social Security disability cases, not criminal defense. At Conn's instruction, Cornett made public statements in which she called herself the "Daughter of the Satan" and she claimed involvement with devil worship in preparation for an insanity defense. The judge overseeing the trial felt that this was not in the best interests of the defendant, so he ordered Conn removed and replaced before the trial started.

The trial began and proceeded, but before the case could go to the jury, the district attorney, Berkeley Bell, decided to offer a deal to the defendants: plead guilty and receive life in prison without parole instead of risking execution if the jury found them guilty and then imposed the death penalty. On March 13, 1998, Cornett and her co-defendants pleaded guilty to all charges against them, thereby avoiding the possible death sentences for her and the three others who were 18 or older. Due to their status as minors, Howell and Bryant were already ineligible for the death penalty, but they accepted the deal on advice of counsel. Although Cornett took the plea bargain, court testimony established that she did not do the actual shooting of the four victims. During her own testimony, Cornett claimed she tried to prevent the deaths. In accordance with the agreement she had entered into, Cornett received three sentences of life in prison without the possibility of parole and two additional prison sentences of 25 years—one each for attempted murder and kidnapping.

== Life in prison ==
Since her arrival at the prison in Nashville, Cornett has earned her GED and a certification in cosmetology. In a 2007 article published in the Knoxville News Sentinel, Madonna Wallen stated that her daughter serves as a mentor for some fellow inmates as they work to earn their GEDs.

=== Involvement in attempted murder ===
On August 24, 2001, Cornett and death row inmate Christa Pike allegedly attacked fellow prisoner Patricia Jones, nearly strangling Jones to death with a shoe lace, after Pike and Jones were placed in a holding cell with Cornett during a fire alarm. Although the Department of Corrections believed that Cornett was involved, investigators found insufficient evidence to charge her with helping Pike, who was subsequently found guilty of attempted murder.
