= Elizabeth Brake =

American philosopher

- Awards: SSHRC grant, APA Book Prize

Academic background
- Education: University of St. Andrews (PhD, MLitt), University of Oxford (BA)

Academic work
- Discipline: Philosophy
- Institutions: Rice University (2019-), Arizona State University (2011-2019), University of Calgary (2000-2011), Auburn University (1998-2000)
- Main interests: Ethics, political philosophy, feminist philosophy, philosophy of sexuality
- Notable works: Minimizing Marriage
- Notable ideas: Amatonormativity
- Website: https://elizabethbrake.com/

Elizabeth Brake is an American philosopher and Professor of Philosophy at the University of Wisconsin–Madison since 2025. Prior to that she was Professor at Rice University. She is known for her works on ethics and political philosophy. Brake coined the term amatonormativity to describe the widespread belief that everyone is better off in an exclusive, romantic, long-term coupled relationship, and that everyone is seeking such a relationship.

Her book Minimizing Marriage received Honorable Mention for the American Philosophical Association Book Prize in 2014. Brake is a former editor of the Journal of Applied Philosophy (2018-2023). She's been an associate editor at Ethics since January 2024.

== Work ==
Brake has a PhD from University of St Andrews (1999) with a dissertation titled Marriage, contract, and the state.

=== Minimizing Marriage and amatonormativity ===
In her 2012 book Minimizing Marriage, amatonormativity was coined as the set of societal assumptions that everyone prospers with an exclusive romantic relationship to capture societal assumptions about romance. Brake wanted to describe the pressure she received by many to prioritize marriage in her own life when she did not want to. Amatonormativity extends beyond social pressures for marriage to include general pressures involving romance. The word amatonormativity comes from amatus, which is the Latin word for "loved", and normativity, referring to societal norms. Related terms include allonormativity, which means a worldview that assumes all people experience sexual and romantic attraction, and compulsory sexuality, which means social norms and practices that marginalize non-sexuality.

According to Brake, one way in which amatonormativity is institutionally applied is the law and morality surrounding marriage. Loving friendships, queerplatonic, and other relationships are not given the same legal protections romantic partners are given through marriage.

=== After Marriage ===
In 2016, she co-edited a book of essays titled After Marriage: Rethinking Marital Relationships. The New York Times wrote in a review of the book that Brake argues that the contractual benefits of marriage might be extended to relationships that are not romantic, such as friendships.

== Books ==
- Minimizing Marriage: Marriage, Morality, and the Law, Oxford University Press, 2012.
- Philosophical Foundations of Children’s and Family Law, edited with Lucinda Ferguson, Oxford University Press, 2018.
- After Marriage: Rethinking Marital Relationships (ed.), Oxford University Press, 2016.
