= Richard C. Martin =

Islamic studies scholar (1938–2019)

Richard C. Martin (1938–2019) was an Islamic studies scholar and emeritus professor of religion at Emory University.

== Biography ==
Martin earned his PhD in Near Eastern Languages and Literature from New York University in 1975. He was the department chair at Emory University from 1996 to 1999 and became emeritus Professor of Religion in August 2012. He was the editor of the Review of Middle East Studies (RoMES) between 2012 and 2020. Martin taught at Virginia Tech University as a Visiting Scholar and chaired the Department of Religious Studies at Arizona State University.

== Works ==
As author

- Approaches to Islam in Religious Studies (Tucson 1985)
- Islamic Studies: A History of Religions Approach (Prentice-Hall 1996)
- Defenders of Reason in Islam: Mu`tazilism from Medieval School to Modern Symbol (Oneworld 1997)

As editor

- Sharing the Book: Religious Perspectives on the Rights and Wrongs of Proselytism with John Witte
- Islamism: Contested Perspectives on Political Islam (Stanford University Press, 2009) with Abbas Barzegar
- Rethinking Islamic Studies: From Orientalism to Cosmopolitanism (University of South Carolina Press, 2010) with Carl W. Ernst
