= Discrimination against asexual people =

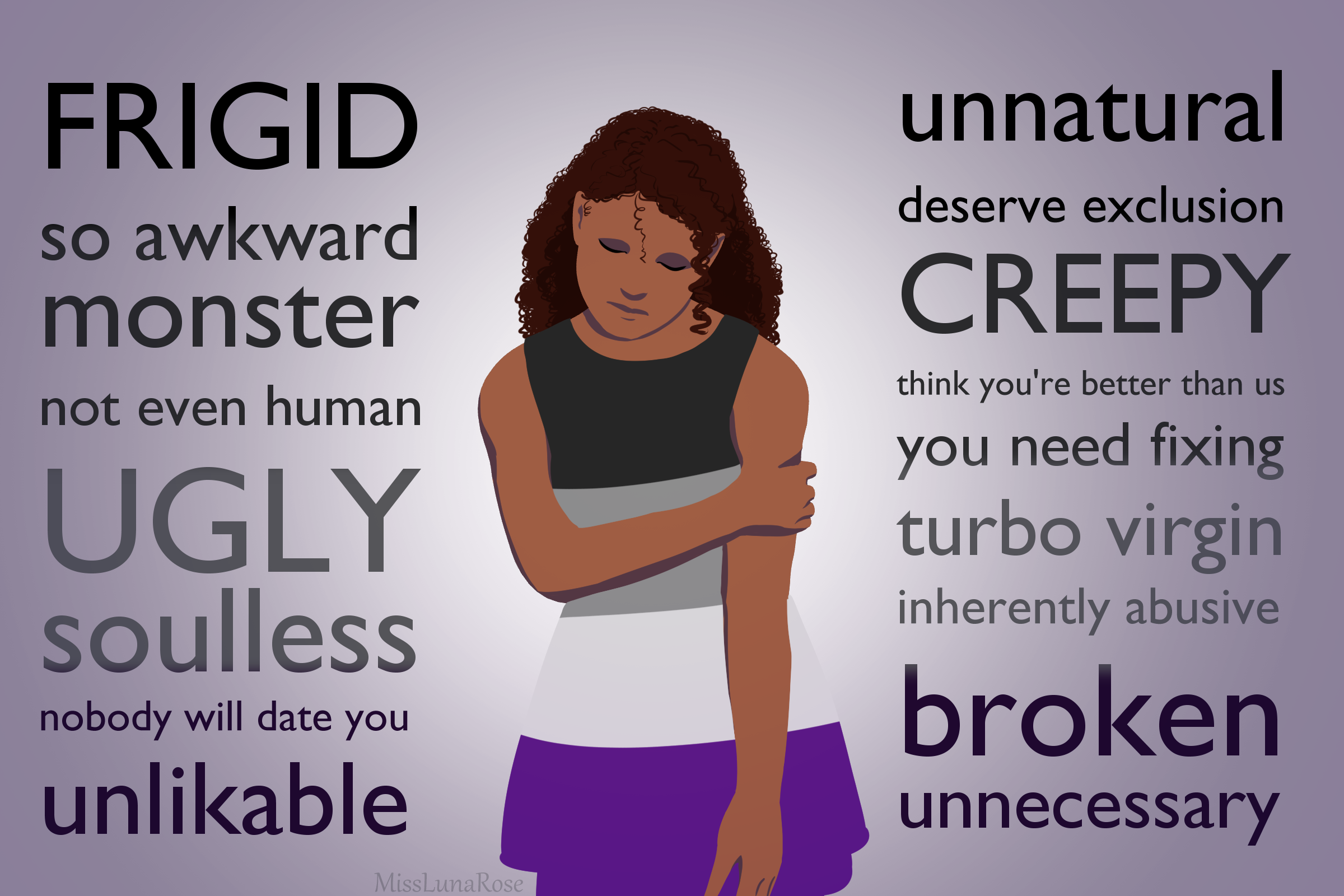
Image showing negative beliefs toward asexual people

Discrimination against asexual people, also known as acephobia, encompasses a range of negative attitudes and behaviors toward asexuality or people who identify as asexual. The term aphobia may also be used if referring more broadly to discrimination against both asexual and aromantic people. Some examples of negative feelings or characterisations toward asexuality include dehumanisation, the belief that asexuality is a mental illness, that asexual people cannot feel love, and the refusal to accept asexuality as a genuine sexual orientation. Asexuality is sometimes confused with celibacy, abstinence, antisexualism, or hyposexuality. As a form of discrimination on the basis of sexual orientation, acephobia belongs under the wider social concept of kyriarchy.

There have been efforts to combat anti-asexual discrimination through legislation or education (such as through workshops on asexuality).

== Forms ==
Behaviours and attitudes that are considered discriminatory include the idea that asexuality is a mental illness, that asexuality is a phase or a choice, the idea that asexual people cannot feel love, and those that make asexual people feel dehumanised. Asexuality may also be perceived as an "excuse" to disengage in certain social interactions, making asexual people a socially rejected group since they are associated with negative social traits.

Asexual people whose asexuality has been accepted only because there is no other explanation for their lack of interest in sexual activity have come to be known as "unassailable asexual[s]". Disbelieving attitudes towards asexuality can leave asexual people afraid to come out.

=== Social ===
Both a study of 148 heterosexual undergraduates at a Canadian university and a study of 101 heterosexual people on SurveyMonkey found participants evaluated asexuals more negatively and as less human than heterosexual, homosexual, and bisexual people. The first study also showed that participants were less likely to rent to asexuals than their heterosexual counterparts, equally likely as to homosexuals, and more likely than to bisexuals. It also found a positive correlation between right-wing authoritarian identification and negative attitudes towards asexuality. The second study also tested the role of unfamiliarity in negative attitudes towards asexuals by including additional questions about sapiosexuals. It found that despite being less familiar with sapiosexuals, participants still held more positive attitudes towards sapiosexuals than asexuals, suggesting that unfamiliarity may not play a significant role in discrimination against asexual people.

==== Misinformation and lack of awareness ====
Despite an increase in media attention over the years, asexuality remains widely poorly-understood; one Sky News survey found that 53% of 1,119 respondents felt confident in defining asexuality, but that 75% of this group did so incorrectly, or defined asexual people as simply lacking a libido.

Some scholars, such as sociologist Mark Carrigan, believe that discrimination against asexual people has more to do with marginalisation than the typical hatred associated with other forms of sexuality-based discrimination such as homophobia, and that much discrimination against asexual people results from a lack of understanding and awareness of asexuality. Others, such as Sherronda J. Brown, author of Refusing Compulsory Sexuality: A Black Asexual Lens on Our Sex-Obsessed Culture, argue that acephobia is directly tied to beliefs that asexuality is impossible or "wrong" and that asexuals deserve to be punished or fixed.

==== Minimisation, denial, and erasure ====
Some online dating services, including Bumble and Match.com, lack the option for users to identify as asexual, which obstructs their ability to find romantic partners.

On 6 April 2025, Harry Potter creator J.K. Rowling criticised the inclusion of "asexual" under the LGBTQIA+ umbrella on the social media platform X, stating of International Asexuality Day, "Happy International Fake Oppression Day to everyone who wants complete strangers to know they don't fancy a shag", among other posts denying asexuality as a valid sexual identity, and promoting the LGB Alliance and its beliefs, which have been described by LGBTQ and human rights organisations as anti-transgender. In 2020, the LGB Alliance stated on whether asexuality should be a protected sexual orientation and identity, "Suggesting ever-expanding definitions for protected characteristics does nothing to promote mutual respect in society." Anti-transgender writer Stephen Wright also described the LGB Alliance as being against including asexual or transgender people as part of the LGBTQIA+ umbrella.

==== Stereotypes and microaggressions ====
Asexual people may be socially discriminated against due to beliefs of heterosexuality being the default sexuality, or the belief that asexual people are just gay or lesbian people in denial of their "real" identity.

Two studies found that asexual people are more dehumanised than heterosexuals, homosexuals, and bisexuals, often being compared to animals or robots due to their sexuality.

==== Within the LGBTQ community ====
Asexual people sometimes face discriminatory attitudes from within the LGBTQ community. In 2011, LGBTQ activist Dan Savage stated that asexuality was a choice, describing it as "choosing not to have sex" and deeming it unworthy of attention. In 2018, the UK's LGBT Foundation stated that, because of a lack of awareness and apprehension, asexual communities are frequently overlooked in the LGBTQ community.

A study of 248 asexual college students shows that some asexual people do not identify with the LGBTQ umbrella. There is also controversy over the inclusion of asexuality in the LGBTQ umbrella for a variety of reasons, including the false belief that asexuals do not experience oppression akin to homophobia and transphobia, and the belief that asexuality is not a real sexual orientation. Sherronda J. Brown of Wear Your Voice stated that some people who oppose the inclusion of asexual people in the LGBTQ community have been known to argue that asexuals are not discriminated against at all, and that asexual people experience straight privilege. Brown criticised this view as erasing the asexual identity on the assumption that asexual people are fraudulent infiltrators of the LGBTQ community, and because it assumes that everyone is straight unless proven otherwise.

==== Sexual violence ====
Asexuals may be pressured into engaging in sexual activity or into going to a doctor to have their asexuality "fixed". Asexuals have also been known to have been subjected to corrective rape. A 2015 survey found that 43.5% of the almost 8,000 asexual people polled had encountered sexual violence, despite the misconception that asexual people never encounter or are involved in sexual situations and are therefore unable to be sexually assaulted.

A 2017 study of over 30,000 students by the Australian Human Rights Commission showed that 15% of students who identified as asexual had been sexually assaulted in 2015 and/or 2016, this rate being second only to that of sexual assault on students who identified as bisexual (18%) and well over the rate for those who identified as homosexual or heterosexual (respectively 8% and 6%).

=== Institutional ===
Having gained recognition as an identity more recently than gay, lesbian, and bisexual people, asexuals often have less legal protection.

In some jurisdictions, marriages can be voided if not legitimised by consummation. Some scholars have argued that this is discriminatory against asexuals. Sex education programmes in schools have also been claimed as discriminatory to asexuals.

In early 2015, Russia passed a law banning, amongst others, people with "disorders of sexual preference" from obtaining driving licences. The Association of Russian Lawyers for Human Rights stated that it effectively banned "all transgender people, bigender, asexuals, transvestites, cross-dressers, and people who need sex reassignment" from driving. In 2026, Niger enacted a new penal code that criminalises asexual "practices".

In March 2018, the Dutch Council of State refused an asylum application by an Algerian national who feared being persecuted due to his asexuality, stating that asexuality does not fall under the LGBTQ exception to the safe country of origin concept because it is not punishable in Algeria and that asexual people are not discriminated against there. The ruling was overturned by the District Court of The Hague, who said that asexuality does fall under the exception because they considered "social discrimination on the grounds of sexual orientation" to include "deviation from traditional relationships" as well as sexual acts.

==== Medicalisation ====
While LGBTQ+ individuals in general have historically had their identities pathologised by medical providers, people who identify as asexual are at particular risk, since lack of sexual interest or desire can be related to conditions such as depression and hypothyroidism, as well as antidepressant medications. A 2020 study of 136 asexual adults showed that between one quarter and one half of them reported medical providers had tried to tie their asexuality to a medical condition.

Ruth Westheimer, a sex therapist, professor, and author, also faced criticism by some for her view that the ability to achieve orgasm would mean that a person could not be asexual, and was further criticised by some in 2015 for implying that asexuality was a problem in need of solving.

=== Media representation ===
In 2012, the TV medical drama House was criticised for its portrayal of asexuality within the medical profession and encouraging scepticism on the legitimacy of asexuality. The storyline centred on the assumption that the asexuality of the episode's patients – a married asexual couple – was the result of a medical condition, with one asexual character being described as a "giant pool of algae" and the titular character betting $100 on finding a medical reason behind another's asexuality. The show was criticised by David Jay, an asexual activist who founded AVEN in 2001, for its depiction of asexuality as a "problematic and pathological" medical condition. In 2017, the decision to turn the character Jughead in Riverdale (a television programme based on Archie Comics) from asexual to heterosexual was met with disapproval, with some people branding it "asexual erasure".

In 2008, Portuguese media would host interviews with asexual people in the Portuguese community. The interviews would revolve around assumptions about an asexual person's sex life, and comments on personal experiences would be invalidated due to not fitting into the media's assumption of asexuality.

In 2019, the video game Death Stranding was criticised for portraying asexuality as a lifestyle, implying that whom one is attracted to is a choice, mistaking asexuality for not wanting emotional bonds, and insinuating that asexuality is responsible for the decline of the birth rate in its world. When the game released a director's cut version in 2021, the data log describing these views was updated and contained an addendum that noted the log "advances a controversial thesis widely regarded as unsubstantiated and discriminatory". This change was praised by critics for acknowledging the criticism that the game originally had, correcting their mistake, and further expanding on why the original log was problematic.

== Intersectionality ==
Aspects of discrimination experienced can depend on other parts of one's identity. Candice N. Hargons, founding director of the Center for Healing Racial Trauma, says, "there is less investment in studying people who are marginalized—and, with at least two intersecting marginalized identities, there is even less attention to black asexuals." A study of 11 asexual women of colour found that the majority of participants were rejected in social groups due to both their race and asexuality.

Some have argued that asexuality has also been used as a tool in anti-Blackness to "de-sexualise" some Black people through racist stereotypes, such as in the mammy archetype in the United States.

== Impacts ==
A 2017 LGBT survey conducted by the Government of the United Kingdom found that 2% of more than 108,000 respondents identified as asexual. Asexual people had the joint-lowest (alongside pansexual people) average life satisfaction of any sexual orientation amongst cisgender respondents. The results of the survey also showed asexual people to be the least comfortable cisgender LGBTQ group within the United Kingdom, and 89% of cisgender asexual respondents – the highest percentage of any group surveyed – were reluctant to be open with their identity for fear of negative reactions. A study on 169 asexual people published in April 2016 by Yale University found that many encountered dismissal and scepticism on coming out.

== Anti-discrimination endeavours ==
In 2002, New York passed the Sexual Orientation Non-Discrimination Act, also known as SONDA, which categorises asexuals as a protected class; it was the first time a U.S. state explicitly protected asexuality by name, and as of 2014, New York remained the only state to have done so. Over twenty other states have sexual orientation anti-discrimination laws, however, a vast majority define them to include "heterosexuality, homosexuality, and bisexuality" and do not include asexuality by name. Some localities in the United States have passed laws that explicitly protect asexuals, but most of them are also in New York. Notably, Albany was the first in 1992, ten years before SONDA became law.

AVEN aims to raise awareness of asexuality through such means as discussions in schools about asexuality and discouraging discriminatory attitudes towards the sexuality. Asexual Awareness Week is an annual event formed by Sarah Beth Brooks in 2010, also with the aim of raising asexual awareness and dispelling misconceptions. There have been attempts to increase awareness of asexuality in universities. A number of community support groups for asexual people have been formed, such as Asexuals of the Mid-Atlantic, a meetup group for asexual people centred in Washington, D.C., whose members founded The Asexual Awareness Project, an asexual advocacy organisation. There have been efforts to stop the exclusion of asexuals from LGBTQ pride events.

In autumn of 2014, the book The Invisible Orientation: An Introduction to Asexuality, written by Julie Sondra Decker, was published, with Decker stating that the aim of the book was for it to be used in sex education to increase common knowledge of sexuality. In 2015, United Kingdom Labour Party parliamentary candidate George Norman called for Parliament to add asexuality to its existing equality legislation, and to recognise that one per cent of the UK's electorate identified as asexual.

The Asexual Aromantic Alliance was founded in 2016 at Iowa State University to encourage co-operation between the asexual and aromantic communities, with the aim of "help[ing to] eliminate acephobia."

== See also ==
- Allonormativity – Concept asserting sexuality as the only social norm
- Amatonormativity – Societal assumption about relationships
- Heteronormativity – Concept asserting heterosexuality as the only social norm
- LGBTQ rights in Niger
