= Amatonormativity =

Societal assumption about relationships

Amatonormativity (/əˌmætənɔːrməˈtɪvəti/) is the set of societal assumptions that everyone prospers with an exclusive romantic relationship. Elizabeth Brake coined the term in her 2012 book Minimizing Marriage to capture societal assumptions about romance. The term has since become established in queer theory, literary studies, in self-help books for aromantic people, and popular science books about aromanticism. Brake sought to describe the pressure she received by many to prioritize marriage in her own life when she did not want to. Amatonormativity extends beyond social pressures for marriage to include general pressures involving romance.

== Etymology ==
The word amatonormativity comes from amatus, which is the Latin word for "loved", and normativity, referring to societal norms. Related terms include allonormativity, which means a worldview that assumes all people experience sexual and romantic attraction, and compulsory sexuality, which means social norms and practices that marginalize non-sexuality. Amatonormativity has been described as the romantic version of compulsory sexuality.

The term was modeled after the term heteronormativity, the belief that heterosexuality is the default for sexual orientation. Normative bias against ethical non-monogamy in particular is known as mononormativity.

== Examples ==
Elizabeth Brake describes the term as a pressure or desire for romance and/or marriage. The desire to find relationships that are romantic, sexual, and lifelong has many social consequences. People who are asexual, aromantic and/or just want to stay single become social oddities. According to researcher Bella DePaulo, it puts a stigma on single people as incomplete and pushes romantic partners to stay in unhealthy relationships because of a fear the partners may have of being single.

Examples of amatonormativity from other writers include family members telling someone "You'll never get a date like that!" in response to a personal style choice like dyed hair or a tattoo, or people assuming that close friends are dating, or romantic relationships being portrayed as more important than friendships in movies and books, and the lack of fiction that is not primarily about romance.

According to Brake, one way in which amatonormativity is institutionally applied is the law and morality surrounding marriage. Loving friendships, queerplatonic, and other relationships are not given the same legal protections romantic partners are given through marriage.

In her 2012 book Minimizing Marriage, Brake defines amatonormativity as "the widespread assumption that everyone is better off in an exclusive, romantic, long-term coupled relationship, and that everyone is seeking such a relationship."

== Uses ==
The term amatonormativity has been covered in major newspapers, and was named by The Atlantic as a trending philosophical topic in 2018. In literary studies the term has been used as a lens to reinterpret same-sex relationships in 19th century novels. Amatonormativity is commonly discussed in self-help books for aromantic and asexual people, and media coverage of platonic relationships as a lifestyle choice.

== See also ==
- Allonormativity
- Aromanticism
- Criticism of marriage
- Discrimination against asexual people
- Heteronormativity
- Marital status
- Marriage
- Relationship anarchy
- Romance (love)
- Romantic orientation
- Single person
