= Drift, Kentucky =

Unincorporated community in Kentucky, United States

- Unincorporated community
- Location within the state of Kentucky Drift (the United States)
- Coordinates: 37°28′49″N 82°44′52″W
- Country: United States
- State: Kentucky
- County: Floyd
- Elevation: 715 ft (218 m)

Population (2000)
  - Total: 569
- Time zone: UTC-5 (Eastern (EST))
  - Summer (DST): UTC-4 (EDT)
- ZIP codes: 41619
- Area code: 606
- GNIS feature ID: 491113

Drift is an unincorporated community and coal town in Floyd County, Kentucky, United States. As of the census of 2000, 569 people were living in the ZIP Code Tabulation Area (ZCTA) for Drift's ZIP code (41619).

== History ==
A post office was established in the community in 1909. The origins of the name Drift are unclear: it may have been named for a local mine or for driftwood found in a nearby creek.

The Beaver Coal & Mining Company was the most well-known operator of mines in the community, but there were also smaller mines such as the Floyd-Elkhorn Consolidated Collieries and the Turner-Elkhorn Coal Company.

== Geography ==
Drift is located at the northern terminus of Kentucky Route 1101 on Kentucky Route 122. The southern terminus of Route 3680 is also near the community.

== Notable people ==
- Crystal Sturgill, perpetrator of the Lillelid murders, attended Floyd County Technical High School in Drift.
- Johnny Ray Turner, former member of Kentucky's 29th Senate district.
