= Robert Livingstone =

Canadian producer and sport business journalist

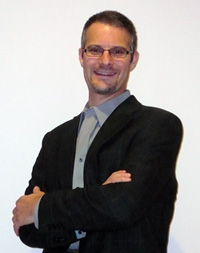
- Born: 1967 (age 58–59); Toronto, Ontario, Canada
- Occupations: Businessman, journalist
- Spouse: Hyla Kurtz (d. 2024)
- Children: 1
- Website: www.gamesbids.com

Robert Livingstone (born 1967) is a Canadian journalist. He is the founder and editor-in-chief of GamesBids, a news and information website for the Olympic Games bid process, since 1998. He "is widely considered one of the world’s foremost experts on the Olympic bidding process."

== Life and career ==
Livingstone's journalistic focus is the Olympic Games' host site selection process, and he frequently comments in the media as a notable expert on the issues related to hosting the Olympic Games by various cities.

In 1998, he launched GamesBids.com, a reference site for Olympic bids as well as BidIndex, an original Olympic bid rating system. There, he also serves as a senior journalist. Since 2000, Livingstone has been said to have been "comprehensively covering all Olympic bids for over two decades". He also covers bids for Commonwealth Games, Asian Games, FIFA World Cup, Pan American Games, Youth Olympic Games and more in both journalistic and opinion pieces.

He was noteworthy during the failed Calgary 2026 Olympic bid when he published his "Dear Calgary:" series that guided the city through the complexities of an Olympic bid before a decisive plebiscite. The series received media acclaim in Calgary along with several Q&A interviews. Calgary mayor Naheed Nenshi apparently took inspiration from Livingstone's remarks during his 2026 Olympic bid campaign when he said “This has been called the most transparent process in Olympic history.” "The mayor was alluding to a tweet from GamesBids.com journalist Robert Livingstone, who covers Olympic bids worldwide" a journalist from The Sprawl reported.

In 2014, Livingstone was invited to carry the torch in the Sochi 2014 Winter Olympics torch relay where he ran a leg in Khanty-Mansiysk, Russia. In 2010, Livingstone became one of the first web-only journalists accredited to cover the Olympic Games.

Livingstone serves as a committee member of the Richmond Hill Sports Hall of Fame in and is a member of the International Society of Olympic Historians. He has appeared on multiple television, radio, and other shows, including on CBC Radio Canada and A&E.

His wife, Hyla, passed away in December 2024. She lived with myotonic dystrophy. The couple had one child.

== Awards ==
In 2015, Livingstone was nominated for an inaugural International Sports Press Association Sport Media Pearl Award in the category of Journalistic Weblog for his work on GamesBids.com. In 2018, he was ranked first in North and South America. He finished on the podium for the first time on May 13, 2025, placing third for Best Column in the 2024 edition, writing about sports politics surrounding Olympic cricket.

Year	Award	Category	Work	Result
2015	AIPS Sport Media Pearl Awards	Best Journalistic Weblog	GamesBids	Shortlisted
2018	AIPS Sport Media Awards	Best Journalistic Weblog	GamesBids	5th (Winner in Americas)
2021	AIPS Sport Media Awards	Best Column	GamesBids	Shortlisted
2024	AIPS Sport Media Awards	Best Column	GamesBids	3rd place globally
