= Criticism of marriage =

Arguments against the morality and practicality of matrimony

Criticisms of marriage are arguments against the practical or moral value of the institution of marriage or particular forms of matrimony. These have included the effects that marriage has on individual liberty, equality between the sexes, the relationship between marriage and violence, philosophical questions about how much control can a government have over its population, the amount of control a person has over another, the financial risk when measured against alternatives and divorce, and questioning of the necessity to have a relationship sanctioned by government or religious authorities.

Criticism of marriage comes from various cultural movements, including branches of feminism, anarchism, Marxism, masculism and queer theory. Feminist activists often point to historical, legal and social inequalities of marriage, family life, and divorce in their criticism of marriage.

== History ==
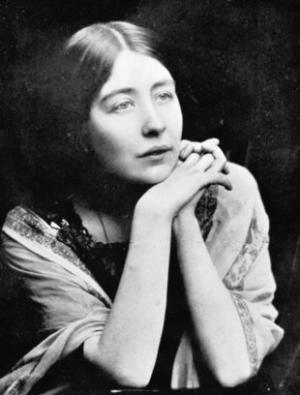
Sylvia Pankhurst (1882 – 1960), British feminist, refused to marry her son's father, creating public scandal.

In 380 BC, Plato criticised marriage in the Republic. He stated that the idea of marriage was a "natural enemy" of the "commonwealth", aiming for its own higher unity.

Paul's first letter to the Corinthians suggests, from the wording in 1 Corinthians 7:1, there were some critics of marriage among the early Christian believers.

In the industrial age a number of notable women writers including Sarah Fielding, Mary Hays, and Mary Wollstonecraft, raised complaints that marriage in their own societies could be characterized as little more than a state of "legal prostitution" with underprivileged women agreeing to marry for the sake of obtaining food, shelter, and other basic necessities of life.

Commentators have often been critical of individual local practices and traditions, leading to historical changes. Examples include the early Catholic Church's efforts to eliminate concubinage and temporary marriage, the Protestant acceptance of divorce, and the abolition of laws against inter-faith and inter-race marriages in the western countries.

The decision not to marry is a presumed consequence of Søren Kierkegaard's philosophy. His well-documented relationship with Regine Olsen is a subject of study in existentialism, as he called off their engagement despite mutual love. Kierkegaard seems to have loved Regine but was unable to reconcile the prospect of marriage with his vocation as a writer and his passionate and introspective Christianity.

A similar argument is found in Franz Kafka's journal entry titled "Summary of all the arguments for and against my marriage":

I must be alone a great deal. What I accomplished was only the result of being alone.

As a high-profile couple, Jean-Paul Sartre and Simone de Beauvoir always expressed opposition to marriage. Brian Sawyer says "Marriage, understood existentially, proposes to join two free selves into one heading, thus denying the freedom, the complete foundation, of each self."

Prior to the legalization of same-sex marriage in the United States, many people banded together to boycott marriage until all people could legally marry. The argument was that since marriage is not an inclusive institution of society, the members of the boycott refuse to support the institution as it existed.

In the West, cohabitation and births outside marriage are becoming more common. In the United States, conservative and religious commentators are highly critical of this trend. They are also often critical of present-day marriage law and the ease of divorce. John Witte, Jr., Professor of Law and director of the Law and Religion Program at Emory University, argues that contemporary liberal attitudes toward marriage produce a family that is "haphazardly bound together in the common pursuit of selfish ends" exactly as prophesied by Nietzsche. In his From Sacrament to Contract, Witte has argued that John Stuart Mill's secular and contractarian model of marriage, developed during the Enlightenment, provided the theoretical justification for the present-day transformation of Anglo-American marriage law, promoting unqualified "right to divorce" on plaintiff's demand, one-time division of property, and child custody without regard for marital misconduct. A Catholic professor Romano Cessario, in a review of Witte's book published in an ecumenical journal the First Things, suggested that a solution to the current crisis of marriage in the West, could come from the possible revival of the sacramental marriage among Christians, thus counterbalancing Nietzsche's pessimism (as echoed by Witte).

== Cultural criticisms ==
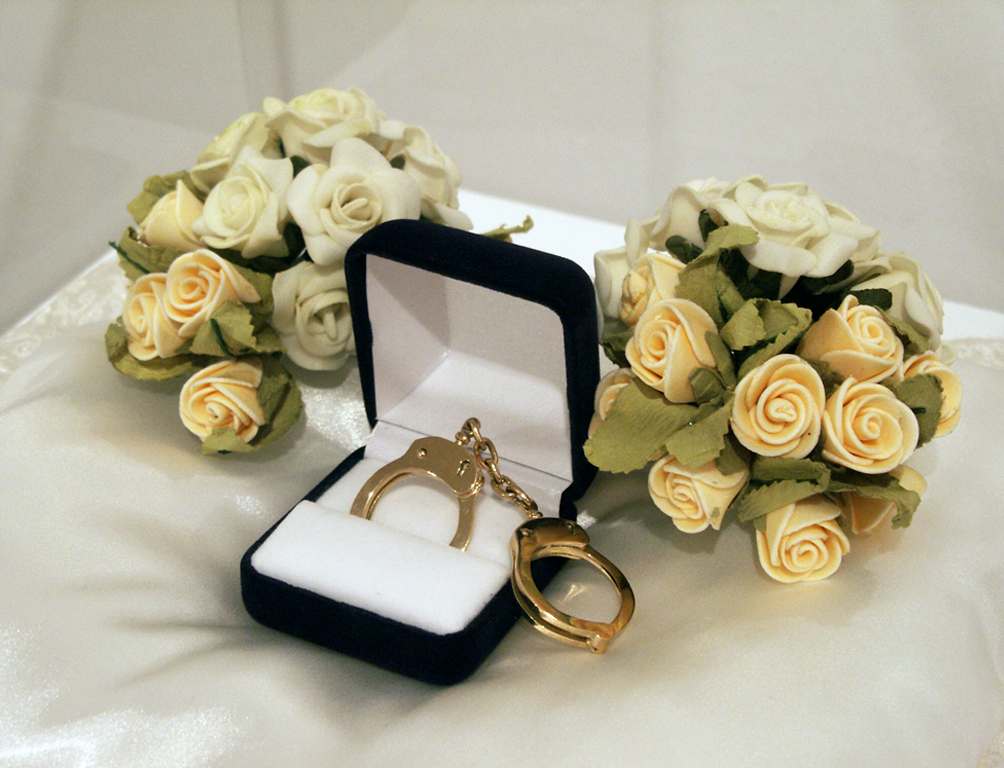
"Esposas de Matrimonio" ("Wedding Cuffs"), a wedding ring sculpture expressing the criticism of marriages' effects on individual liberty. Esposas is a Spanish pun, in which the singular form of the word esposa refers to a spouse, and the plural refers to handcuffs.

=== Male dominance ===
Critics of marriage argue that it is an institution which contributes to the maintaining of traditional gender roles, thus preventing women from achieving social equality, and reinforcing the idea that women exist to serve men, which in turn increases the abuse of women. They argue that marriage reinforces the traditional paradigm of male-female interaction: subordination of the woman to the man in exchange for subsistence. According to Sheila Jeffreys "the traditional elements of marriage have not completely disappeared in western societies, even in the case of employed, highly educated and well paid professional women." She argues that even such women remain in abusive marriages out of fear of leaving and out of duty. Even in Western countries, married women "feel they have no choice but to stay and endure and may be 'loving to survive.'"

=== Normalization and discrimination ===
Some commentators criticize government authorities for promotion of marriage. They also criticize the romanticized image that marriage is given in films and romance novels. Around 1980, over 40% of books sold in America were romance novels.

Some critics argue that people cannot form an objective image of what marriage is if they are from early childhood indoctrinated into believing marriage is desirable and necessary.

Critics of marriage argue that this institution represents a form of state sponsored discrimination, in a generalized way against people who do not marry, and in a particular way against certain racial or ethnic groups who are less likely to marry and more likely to have children outside marriage, such as African Americans in the US - by stigmatizing such individuals, presenting their lifestyle as abnormal and denying them rights. Dean Spade and Craig Willse write that:

The idea that married families and their children are superior was and remains a key tool of anti-Black racism. Black families have consistently been portrayed as pathological and criminal in academic research and social policy based on marriage rates, most famously in the Moynihan Report.

=== Social isolation ===
What is it about modern coupledom that makes policing another person's behaviour a synonym for intimacy? (Or is it something about the conditions of modern life itself: is domesticity a venue for control because most of us have so little of it elsewhere?) Then there's the fundamental premise of monogamous marriage: that mutual desire can and will last throughout a lifetime. And if it doesn't? Well apparently you're just supposed to give up on sex, since waning desire for your mate is never an adequate defence for 'looking elsewhere'. At the same time, let's not forget how many booming businesses and new technologies have arisen to prop up sagging marital desire. Consider all the investment opportunities afforded: Viagra, couples pornography, therapy. If upholding monogamy in the absence of desire weren't a social dictate, how many enterprises would immediately fail?

— American cultural critic and essayist Laura Kipnis, 2003

A criticism of marriage is that it may lead to the social isolation of a person, who may be expected to diminish other relations with friends, relatives or colleagues, in order to be fully dedicated to their spouse. Sociologists Naomi Gerstel and Natalia Sarkisian wrote that marriage is also found to be often at odds with community, diminishing ties to relatives, neighbors, and friends. Julie Bindel writes that: "Maybe those at the most risk of ending up alone are not the folk who never marry, but rather the people who chuck all their eggs in one basket. [...] During their marriage, believing as they did that they only needed each other, both parties would have neglected friendships, or indeed, failed to cultivate new ones".

=== Symbolism ===
Some critics assert that marriage will always remain a symbolic institution signifying the subordination of women to men. Clare Chambers points to the sexist traditions surrounding marriage and weddings; she writes:

Symbolically, the white wedding asserts that women's ultimate dream and purpose is to marry, and remains replete with sexist imagery: the white dress denoting the bride's virginity (and emphasising the importance of her appearance); the minister telling the husband "you may now kiss the bride" (rather than the bride herself giving permission, or indeed initiating or at least equally participating in the act of kissing); the reception at which, traditionally, all the speeches are given by men; the wife surrendering her own name and taking her husband's.

The history of marriage in relation to women makes it an institution that some critics argue cannot and should not be accepted in the 21st century; to do so would mean to trivialize the abuses it was responsible for. Some critics argue that it is impossible to dissociate marriage from its past. Clare Chambers argues that:

(...) it is impossible to escape the history of the institution. Its status as a tradition ties its current meaning to its past". Past abuses of marriage are sometimes depicted in documentaries. A documentary in Ireland presented the story of elderly women who described their experiences with repeated acts of rape in marriage and the children born from these rapes, during the time when marital rape was not criminalized, contraception, abortion and divorce were all illegal, and the marriage bar restricting married women's employment outside the home was in force. Marital rape in Ireland was made illegal in 1990, and divorce was legalized in 1996.

=== Violence against women ===
Violence related to female virginity is considered a problem. In many parts of the world, it is socially expected for the bride to be a virgin; if the husband has sex with his wife after marriage and she does not bleed (it is common for a woman to not bleed when she has sex for the first time), this can end in extreme violence, including an honor killing.

The common view of marital life as "private" and outside the sphere of public intervention allows violence to flourish. Elizabeth Brake writes that "privacy" protects "unequal divisions of domestic labor, domestic violence, and exclusion of health coverage for abortion and contraception." Mary Lyndon Shanley writes that police often "ignore complaints of domestic violence because they do not want to 'intrude' on the private realm of the married couple."

=== Divorce ===
According to Dan Moller's "Bachelor's Argument", modern marriage can be compared to the act of "forging professional credentials." He argues that over 40% of marriages end in divorce, and therefore should be avoided similar to any high-risk venture.

== Legal criticisms ==
=== Economic dependence ===
Marriage has been criticized in its complicity of wives' economic dependence on husbands due to the gendered division of labour and that women's work typically pays less than men's work. Women are more likely to downgrade or drop out of their careers to assist in child rearing or when their career conflicts with their husband's. Absent a career, women become dependent on legally granted marriage benefits such as a husband's health insurance, and are thus increasingly dependent on their husband. This dependence can facilitate abuse because the marriage becomes economically difficult to leave.

=== Immobility ===
In some conservative cultures, married women are not allowed to leave home without the consent of the husband - a prohibition that is supported by the law itself in many of these countries. For instance, in Yemen, marriage regulations state that a wife must obey her husband and must not leave home without his permission.

=== Marital rape ===
Historically, in many cultures marriage has been used to regulate sexuality, rather than consent regulating it. That is, non-marital sex was banned regardless of consent, while marital sex was an enforceable obligation. From the mid-20th century onward, changing social norms have led to, among other things, the decriminalization of consensual non-marital sex and the criminalization of marital rape. These changes are not universal around the world, and in many countries they have not occurred. One of the concerns about marriage is that it may contradict the notion of sexual self-determination, due to cultural, religious, and in many countries also legal norms. For instance, sex outside marriage is still punishable by death in some jurisdictions. In 2014, Amnesty International's Secretary General stated that "It is unbelievable that in the twenty-first century some countries are condoning child marriage and marital rape while others are outlawing abortion, sex outside marriage and same-sex sexual activity – even punishable by death."

In various places, men have sexual authority over their wives, in law and in practice. The men decide when and where to have sex, and wives have no power to stop unwanted sex. In certain countries marital rape is legal, and even where it is illegal it is infrequently reported or prosecuted. Often, married women also cannot stop unwanted pregnancy, because in various countries modern contraception is not available, and in some countries married women need legal permission from their husband to use contraception (and even in countries where the husband's consent is not legally required in practice it is asked for), and abortion is illegal or restricted, and in some countries married women need the consent of their husband for abortion. Therefore, marriage leads to a situation which allows not only forced sex, but also forced pregnancy, and in some of these countries pregnancy and childbirth remain dangerous because of lack of adequate medical care. The effects of sexual violence inside marriage are exacerbated by the practice of child marriage; in 2013 an 8-year-old Yemeni girl died from internal bleeding after she was raped by her 40-year-old new husband. Sheila Jeffreys argues that the very institution of marriage is based on the idea that heterosexual sex is the absolute right of the man and the absolute duty of the woman; that men are entitled to demand sex on their terms and to coerce sex, and women are not allowed to ever refuse it. Lack of economic opportunity means that wives have no choice but to "allow sexual access to their bodies in return for subsistence".

=== Relationship favoritism ===
Another issue is the question of why relations that are (or are believed to be) sexual are favored in law with regard to legal protections and promotion, and those that are not (or are believed not to be) are not. This is especially the case as marriage rates are quite low in many Western countries, and the state has been criticized for ignoring other living arrangements that are not sexual relations; and there have been increased objections to legal concepts such as consummation or adultery that critics argue do not belong in modern law. It is argued that with regard to family life, the state should regulate the parental rights and responsibilities of parents, not focus on whether there is an ongoing sexual/romantic relation between the parents.

=== State control ===
A criticism of marriage is that it gives the state undue power and control over the private lives of the citizens. The statutes governing marriage are drafted by the state, and not by the couples who marry under those laws. The laws may, at any time, be changed by the state without the consent (or even knowledge) of the married people. The terms derived from the principles of institutionalized marriage represent the interests of the governments. Proponents of marriage privatization argue that private marriage prevents said state's undue power and control. For example, Michael Kinsley emphasizes marriage privatization's potential to end the controversy over same-sex marriage, as well as create equality between same-sex and straight marriage by removing official government sanctions for both.

Critics of marriage argue that it is an institution based on control, domination and possession, and that attempting to exercise control over another person's life is immoral and dangerous, and should not be encouraged by the state. Claudia Card, professor of philosophy at the University of Wisconsin-Madison, writes that:

The legal rights of access that married partners have to each other's persons, property, and lives makes it all but impossible for a spouse to defend herself (or himself), or to be protected against torture, rape, battery, stalking, mayhem, or murder by the other spouse... Legal marriage thus enlists state support for conditions conducive to murder and mayhem.

=== Violence against women ===
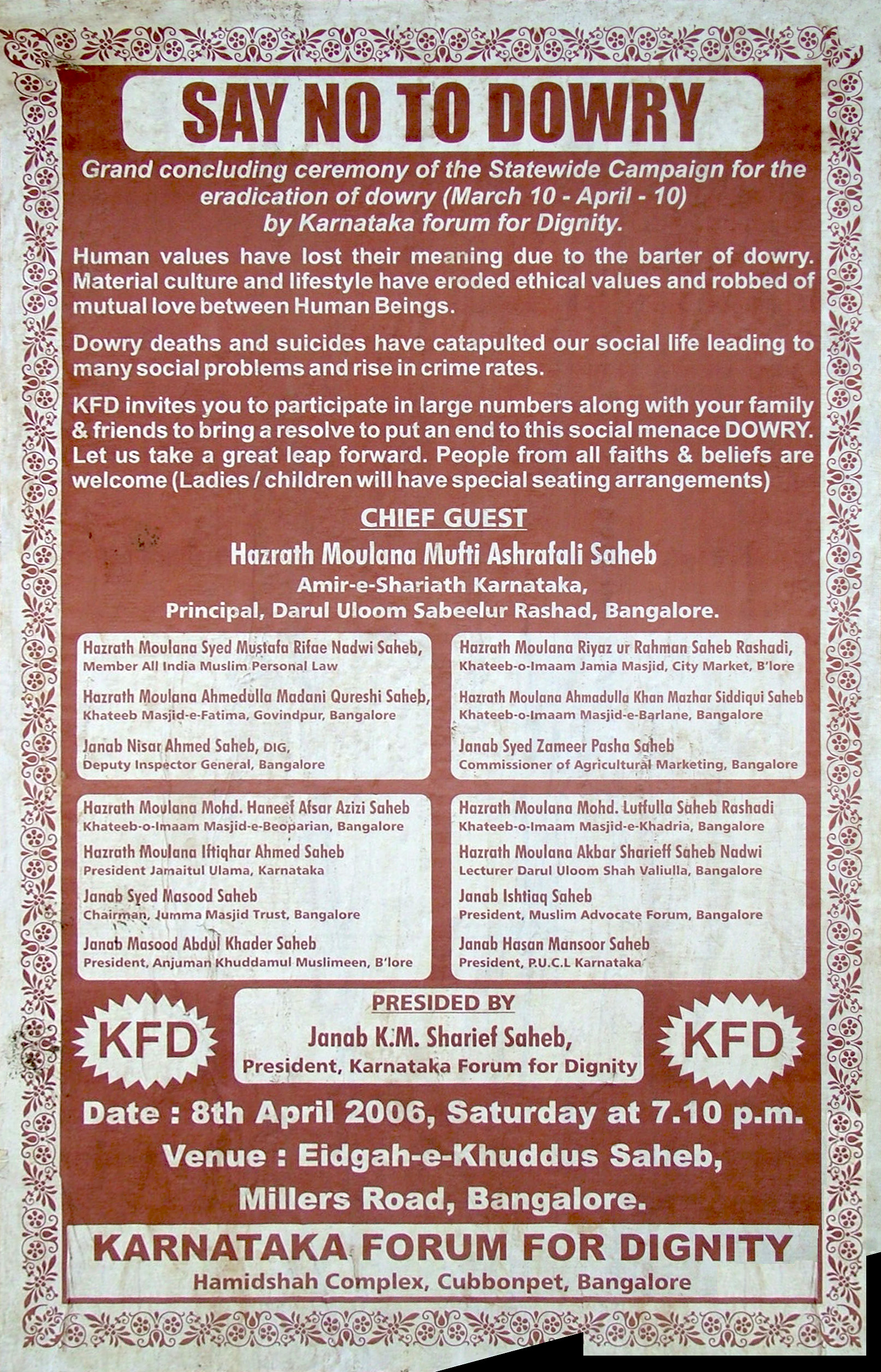
Anti-dowry poster in Bangalore, India. See dowry death

The United Nations General Assembly defines "violence against women" as "any act of gender-based violence that results in, or is likely to result in, physical, sexual or mental harm or suffering to women, including threats of such acts, coercion or arbitrary deprivation of liberty, whether occurring in public or in private life." The 1993 Declaration on the Elimination of Violence Against Women noted that this violence could be perpetrated by assailants of either gender, family members and even the "State" itself.

Critics of marriage argue that it is complicit in the mistreatment and subjugation of women across the world. Common concerns raised today focus on the health and general well-being of women, who, in parts of the world, have virtually no protection in law or in practice against domestic violence within marriage. It is also nearly impossible for women there to get out of abusive relationships. Abuses are upheld by claims of possession and entitlement in some cultures and the well-being of women is undermined by a powerful act of subordination. According to Gerstel and Sarkisian, domestic violence, isolation, and housework tend to increase for women who sign marriage contracts. Those with lower income draw even fewer benefits from it. Bad marriages, according to Gerstel and Sarkisian, result in higher levels of stress, suicide, hypertension, cancer, and slower wound healing in women.

Opponents of legal marriage contend that it encourages violence against women, both through practices carried out within a marriage (such as beating and rape inside marriage - which are legal in some countries and tolerated in many more), and through acts related to marital customs (such as honor killings for refusing arranged marriages; forcing rape victims to marry their rapist, marriage by abduction; or executions for sex outside marriage). In some parts of the world, the extreme stigma cast on women who have reached a certain age and are still unmarried often leads these women to suicide. Suicide is also a common response of women caught in abusive marriages with no possibility of leaving those marriages. Women who are faced with the prospect of forced marriage may commit suicide. Violence and trafficking related to payment of dowry and bride price are also problems. Dowry deaths especially occur in South Asia, and acid throwing is also a result of disputes related to dowry conflicts.

In various countries, married men have authority over their wives. For instance, Yemeni marriage regulations state that a wife must obey her husband and must not leave home without his permission. In Iraq, husbands have a legal right to punish their wives. The criminal code states that there is no crime if an act is committed while exercising a legal right. Examples of legal rights include: "The punishment of a wife by her husband, the disciplining by parents and teachers of children under their authority within certain limits prescribed by law or by custom". In the Democratic Republic of Congo, the Family Code states that the husband is the head of the household; the wife owes her obedience to her husband; a wife has to live with her husband wherever he chooses to live; and wives must have their husbands' authorization to bring a case in court or to initiate other legal proceedings.

== Specific criticisms ==
=== Anarchist ===
Famous anarchist Emma Goldman wrote how marriage was not a love pact but an economic agreement that restricts men's and mainly women's freedoms. She criticized how wives were surrendered freedoms permanently for the sake of marriage, and how sexuality and child rearing outside of marriage is shamed.

=== Feminist ===
Marriage is a focus of many feminist concerns. Of these many cultural concerns include the fact that within many marriages women are generally expected to do most of the work in the home, even if they had careers outside the home. A more economic concern is that marriage may also foster economic dependence since women's work is underpaid and women are expected to downgrade their careers when their careers conflict with their husband's or with work in the home. Without appropriate finances women can become dependent on their husband's marriage benefits like health insurance.

Some feminists have argued for the reform of marriage while others have argued for its abolition, saying that it is entrenched in sexist cultural norms and a legal structure that promotes it.

Sheila Cronan said that the freedom for women "cannot be won without the abolition of marriage." "The institution of marriage – wrote Marlene Dixon of the Democratic Workers Party – is the chief vehicle for the perpetuation of the oppression of women; it is through the role of wife that the subjugation of women is maintained".

Activist Andrea Dworkin wrote in the 1980s as part of her feminist anti-pornography campaign, using her characteristic "hyperbolic, overheated, enormously exaggerated prose", that:

Marriage as an institution developed from rape as a practice. Rape, originally defined as abduction, became marriage by capture. Marriage meant the taking was to extend in time, to be not only use of but possession of, or ownership.

Early second-wave feminist literature in the West, specifically opposed to marriage include personalities such as Kate Millett (Sexual Politics, 1969), Germaine Greer (The Female Eunuch, 1970), Marilyn French (The Women's Room, 1977), Jessie Bernard (The Future of Marriage, 1972), and Shulamith Firestone (The Dialectic of Sex: The Case for Feminist Revolution, 1970).

In the book The Second Sex, author Simone de Beauvoir argues that marriage is an alienating institution. Men can become tied to supporting a wife and children and women can become dependent on their husbands, and children can become the target of rage when the stresses of marriage overwhelm their parents. She argues about marriage that "Any institution which solders one person to another, obliging people to sleep together who no longer want to is a bad one".

=== Marxist ===
The separation of the family from the clan and the institution of monogamous marriage were the social expressions of developing private property; so-called monogamy afforded the means through which property could be individually inherited. And private property for some meant no property for others, or the emerging of differing relations to production on the part of different social groups. The core of Engels’ formulation lies in the intimate connection between the emergence of the family as an economic unit dominated by the male and this development of classes.

— Anthropologist and social theorist Eleanor Leacock

Within early Marxist texts there existed critiques of marriage. Friedrich Engels wrote how the origins of marriage were not for the purposes of love but instead for private property rights. Monogamous marriage became an institution to be the base of the family and solidify a system for the family to handle private property and its inheritance. Monogamy would later spur on adultery and the business of prostitution.

=== Men's movement ===
Marriage is a topic of concern for many masculinists, as they mention that the system is biased in favor of women, mentioning how some women use the laws to their advantage, leaving men at a great legal disadvantage, especially in the area of divorce laws

Likewise, there are studies that indicate that a large number of men avoid marriage because they see it as a loss of freedom and even a loss with divorce.

Esther Vilar mentions in The Manipulated Man, that women use marriage as a way to subjugate men by turning them into slaves to work for them and their families:

If a young man gets married, starts a family, and spends the rest of his life working at a soul-destroying job, he is held up as an example of virtue and responsibility. The other type of man, living only for himself, working only for himself, doing first one thing and then another simply because he enjoys it and because he has to keep only himself, sleeping where and when he wants, and facing woman when he meets her, on equal terms and not as one of a million slaves, is rejected by society. The free, unshackled man has no place in its midst.

The historian Daniel Jiménez in his book "Deshumanizando al Varón" denies the idea that marriage exclusively oppresses women, mentioning how women exercised power against their husbands legally, and that more than an oppression it was a "infantilization of the female sex", In addition, Jiménez cites some Roman texts such as Satire VI or the poem "De coniuge non ducenda", where a criticism is made of marriage and domestic violence against men.

Other masculinist texts that criticize marriage are: The Legal Subjection of Men by Ernest Belfort Bax (1908), The Polygamous Sex by Esther Vilar (1976), The Myth of Male Power by Warren Farrell (1993), Women Or Men - Who are the Victims? by Erin Pizzey (2000), Legalizing Misandry by Katherine K. Young and Paul Nathanson (2006), Men on Strike by Helen Smith (2013) and The Second Sexism: Discrimination Against Men and Boys by David Benatar (2012)

=== Queer theory ===
Within Queer theory a critique exists that the legalization of same-sex marriage simply normalizes the cultured gender norms and economic inequalities of marriage into the LGBT community. Also that the normalization of marriage delegitimizes non-monogamous relationships which are considered common in the LGBT community.

== See also ==
- Cohabitation
- Divorce demography
- Free union
- Marriage gap
- 1993 UN Declaration on the Elimination of Violence against Women
- Free love

=== Religious views ===
- Christian views on marriage
- Islamic marital jurisprudence
- Buddhist view of marriage
- Marriage in Hinduism
- Jewish views on marriage
