= Analloeroticism =

Lack of sexual interest in other persons

Analloeroticism (/ˌænˌæloʊ.ɪˈrɒtɪsɪzəm/) is having no sexual interests in other people. Anil Aggrawal considers it distinct from asexuality and defines the latter as the lack of a sex drive. Analloerotics are unattracted to female or male partners, but not necessarily devoid of all sexual behaviour.

In his typology of trans women, Ray Blanchard stated that, in spite of autogynephilia and heterosexual attraction more often than not coexisting, there were some cases in which autogynephilia was so intense that it effectively nullified any sexual attraction to women (in other words, they were analloerotic).

According to Blanchard, there are two main types of analloeroticism:

- Asexual (lack of sexual desire)
- Automonosexual (sexually aroused by the thought of themselves as the opposite sex but not by other persons)

== See also ==
- Autoeroticism
- Transvestic fetishism
