= Allonormativity =

Concept asserting sexuality as the only social norm

Allonormativity is the assumption that all humans experience sexual attraction. It contributes to discrimination against asexual individuals via social systems and structures which privilege or incentivize sexual relationships over single individuals.

The term could be considered an expansion of heteronormativity, the idea that heterosexuality is the default or normative sexuality. The term is often used when discussing the pathologization, erasure, and dehumanization of asexual and aromantic individuals in society, media, and within academic discourses.

== Etymology ==
Allonormativity was derived from allosexual, which in turn was derived from the Greek prefix allo-, meaning different or other, and -sexual, i.e., attraction directed towards a target outside the self. The second element, -normativity, refers to the societal worldview which deems allosexuality as normal or desired.

== Effects ==
Growing up in an allonormative society may lead to asexual individuals feeling broken or isolated prior to or even after learning about asexuality. Because allonormativity presents asexuality as deviant, it also contributes to the pathologization of and discrimination against asexual people.

== See also ==
- Amatonormativity
- Compulsory heterosexuality
