= Lillelid murders =

1997 mass shooting in Tennessee, U.S.

- Location: Greene County, Tennessee, U.S., near Baileyton
- Date: April 6, 1997; 29 years ago
- Target: Lillelid family
- Attack type: Mass shooting, carjacking
- Weapon: Pistol
- Deaths: Vidar Lillelid; Delfina Lillelid; Tabitha Lillelid (Note: Death occurred the following day due to traumatic brain injury)
- Injuries: Peter Lillelid
- Perpetrators: Natasha Cornett; Karen Howell; Crystal Sturgill; Jason Bryant; Dean Mullins; Joseph Risner
- Convictions: First-degree murder in three counts (both); Attempted murder on a child (both)
- Sentence: Life imprisonment without the possibility of parole (both)

The Lillelid murders were a series of killings that took place in Greene County, Tennessee, United States. Three members of the Lillelid family were killed on April 6, 1997. Vidar Lillelid (aged 34), Delfina Lillelid (aged 28), their daughter Tabitha (aged 6), and son Peter (aged 2) were shot on a deserted rural road near Baileyton after a carjacking committed by a group of youths. Vidar and Delfina were found dead at the scene, while Tabitha died after being transported to the hospital. Peter survived, but, as a result of the shooting, was left with disabilities. Six young people from Kentucky, including two minors, were convicted of felony murder for the three deaths. Each received three life sentences, and an additional sentence of 25 years for the attempted murder of Peter.

== Background ==
Vidar Lillelid was born and raised in Bergen, Norway. He moved to the United States in 1985. In 1989, Vidar married Delfina Zelaya, a first-generation Honduran American from New York City, whom he had met through their common involvement in the Jehovah's Witnesses. Vidar and Delfina had two children: Tabitha, born on October 30, 1990, and Peter, born on March 3, 1995; both had dual Norwegian and American citizenship.

== Murders ==
On April 6, 1997, six young people, ages 14 to 20, from Pikeville, Kentucky—Jason Bryant, Natasha Cornett, Dean Mullins, Joseph Risner, Crystal Sturgill, and Karen Howell—were travelling to New Orleans, Louisiana, in a Chevrolet Citation car owned by Risner's mother with $500 Howell had saved (later claimed by the DA to have been "stolen"). Cornett was the leader of the group. Shortly after leaving Pikeville, they realized that Risner's car would likely not make it to New Orleans. They discussed stealing a vehicle from a parking lot or a dealership. The group was armed with two handguns, one 9 mm and the other .25 caliber.

At a rest stop along Interstate 81 outside Baileyton, in rural Greene County, Tennessee, eyewitnesses observed six youths in conversation with the Lillelid family, who were returning home to Knoxville after attending a religious convention in Johnson City. Vidar, carrying his son Peter, had approached Cornett and Howell to discuss his religious views. Risner and Bryant joined the conversation. Vidar asked them to join him at a picnic table to talk further. Risner, Bryant, Cornett and Howell followed him up the hill while Mullins and Sturgill remained in the car. At some point during the talk, Risner displayed one of the guns and said, "I hate to do you this way, but we are going to have to take you with us for your van." As Risner directed the Lillelid family into their van, Vidar pleaded with the group, offering his keys and wallet in exchange for being left at the rest stop, but Risner refused.

Risner, Bryant, Howell, and Cornett rode in the van with the Lillelids. Vidar drove while Risner, holding the gun on him, sat in the passenger seat. Mullins and Sturgill followed in Risner's car. In an attempt to calm her children, Delfina began to sing; Bryant reportedly ordered her to stop. Risner directed the Lillelids first to the interstate and then to a secluded road at the next exit, Payne Hollow Lane, near Greeneville. The Lillelids exited the van and gathered on the side of the road, where they were shot. Checking the bodies, Bryant stated, "They're still fucking alive," and shot them again.

== Arrest ==
After removing the license plates from Risner's car, the group abandoned it at the crime scene. They continued their journey towards New Orleans in the van, leaving the family for dead. They stopped at a Waffle House while traveling through Georgia, but left the restaurant when a group of police officers arrived. They decided to drive into Mexico instead of going to New Orleans. When they reached the border, they were initially denied admittance because they did not have the proper forms of identification, but eventually found a way into the country. While in Mexico, Bryant was shot in the hand and leg, and the group was stopped by the Mexican police. When they claimed they were lost, the officers ordered the group out of the van and conducted a search, finding a knife, as well as a photo album belonging to the Lillelid family. They ordered the group to re-enter the United States, where American border patrol officers searched them and subsequently took them to an Arizona jail. At the time of their arrest, two days after the murders, several of them had personal items belonging to the Lillelids in their possession.

== Investigation ==
=== Autopsies ===
Cleland Blake, a forensic pathologist, testified that Vidar's body had six gunshot wounds, one to the right side of his head and five to his chest. The first shot entered his right eye, traveled through his temple, and exited in front of his right ear. While he could not be certain, it was Blake's opinion that this shot was fired from a 9 mm handgun and would have caused a loss of consciousness. Vidar then fell to the ground, on his back, and was shot three times in the upper right side of his chest. The wounds were described as also being consistent with those from a 9 mm, and targeted so that they would form an equilateral triangle. A wound just below Vidar's nipple was consistent with a .25 caliber weapon, and a final wound from a 9 mm was located just beneath it. There was a laceration on Vidar's right forearm where he had been grazed by a bullet, and post-mortem superficial abrasions to the back of his legs. Vidar most likely died within a few minutes of the initial gunshot to his right eye.

Delfina was shot eight times, and all eight bullets were recovered; six were from a 9 mm and two were from a .25 caliber. The first shot, from a 9 mm, shattered a bone in her left arm; the second shot, also from a 9 mm, shattered her left femur. Blake testified that these shots would not have killed her, but would have caused severe pain, leaving her unable to stand. Delfina was shot an additional six times while on her back, with the first three shots striking the left side of her abdomen. It was Blake's opinion that these shots were fired to form a triangular pattern, similar to the injuries inflicted on Vidar. The three shots pierced her stomach, leaving a four- to five-inch tear, and traveled through her pancreas, spleen, left kidney, and left adrenal gland. A final 9 mm entry wound was located at the midsection of Delfina's abdomen just above her navel, and the bullet was recovered from her spine. There was a .25 caliber gunshot wound under her left armpit where the bullet entered, coming to a stop in the skin on the back of her left shoulder. Another shot caused a wound to Delfina's left side, and the bullet was recovered from the center of her liver. She also suffered abrasions on her right calf. Delfina's wounds were not immediately fatal, and she could have been conscious for as long as 25 minutes, including while her body was driven over by the van.

Six-year-old Tabitha was shot once in the head with a small-caliber weapon, with the bullet entering the left side of her skull, traveling downward, and exiting behind her right ear. The wound caused immediate brain death. Hospitalized, she remained on life support until her uncle, who had been named her custodian, gave permission for several of her organs to be donated. Physicians harvested her heart, liver, gallbladder, kidneys, pancreas, spleen, and adrenal glands. Tabitha was pronounced dead one day after the shooting.

Vidar, Delfina, and Tabitha were buried together at Edgewood Cemetery in their hometown of Knoxville.

=== Peter Lillelid ===
Two-year-old Peter was shot twice with a small-caliber weapon. One shot entered behind his right ear and exited near his right eye. A second gunshot penetrated his back and exited through his chest. He was transported by a Lifestar helicopter to the pediatric intensive care unit at the University of Tennessee Memorial Hospital in Knoxville, where he was listed in critical condition. Peter survived and was left disabled, he required vigorous resuscitation having sustained a contusion to his right lung with some residual bleeding in his right chest cavity. Doctors removed his damaged eye 11 days after the shootings. He remained in the hospital for 17 days before being transferred to a Knoxville rehabilitation center.

=== Perpetrators ===
All six of the perpetrators were from Kentucky, were known to have had troubled backgrounds, struggled academically or with substance abuse, and—with the exception of Bryant—had attended Betsy Layne High School.

==== Natasha Cornett ====
Natasha Leanne Wallen Cornett, 18, was born in Betsy Layne, Kentucky. She was the product of an affair and grew up in poverty. Cornett had been a polite and good student until sixth grade, when her academic performance declined. She left school before completing ninth grade, and had no history of employment except babysitting. Cornett started using alcohol and illegal drugs, including heroin, ecstasy, and cocaine. At the age of 14, she was arrested for forgery due to the theft of a box of checks, and sentenced by the juvenile court to one year of probation. Cornett was arrested a second time for assaulting her mother, Madonna Wallen, and threatening to kill her with a knife, but her mother declined to press charges. On her 17th birthday, she married Steve Cornett, but the marriage ended after only ten months.

==== Dean Mullins ====
Edward Dean Mullins, 19, was born on January 26, 1978, in Harold, Kentucky. He had left school in 1996 during his twelfth grade year, but was working on his GED. Mullins had no criminal record, and had been employed at a grocery store in Pikeville, Kentucky, in 1993 and 1994. Mullins' family and friends stated that his behavior worsened after becoming involved with Cornett, whom he had planned to marry.

==== Joseph Risner ====
Joseph Lance Risner, 20, was born on October 13, 1976, in Hazard, Kentucky. He never met his biological father, and adopted his stepfather's last name. His family lived in Columbia, Kentucky, but moved to Georgia where he started fourth grade. Risner was described as a satisfactory student with a good work ethic until the separation of his mother and stepfather, which affected him emotionally. He and his mother moved back to Kentucky, where he had history of marijuana, alcohol, and LSD usage. He claimed that he had sexual relationships with two of his babysitters when he was 12 years old. Risner declined academically, failing seventh and eighth grade, before his marks improved in tenth grade, which he completed at Betsy Layne High School. It was there that he met the other perpetrators, including his girlfriend Howell. Risner joined the Army in June 1995 but received an administrative discharge after testing positive for marijuana. He earned a GED on May 29, 1996, and was accepted at Mayo Regional Technology Center in September 1996. Risner was the eldest of the group.

==== Crystal Sturgill ====
Crystal Rena Sturgill, 18, was born on March 13, 1979, in Harold, Kentucky. Her mother, Teen Blackburn, refused to divulge the name of her father, and his name does not appear on her birth certificate. She was in her senior year at Betsy Layne High School and also attended Floyd County Technical School in Drift, Kentucky, where records indicate she had been a slightly above-average student. Sturgill's academic performance declined in high school; she blamed this on drugs and alcohol. However, she performed well on standardized tests, including a total score of 28 on her ACT, and had applied for admission to several colleges. She worked in the Betsy Layne Elementary School daycare as part of a co-op program. Her supervisors described Sturgill as a capable child caregiver, and she received very high marks. Like Mullins, Sturgill had no criminal record as either a juvenile or an adult, but had been suspended from school several times. Observers commented on the amount of emotional neglect Sturgill suffered in her home; in December 1996, she accused her stepfather of repeated sexual abuse. After the accusations, Sturgill moved in with her aunt in Prestonsburg, Kentucky. She began attending Prestonsburg High School in January 1997, but soon had to move out of her aunt's home. She lived in approximately thirteen different places from the time she made the allegations in December until the shootings occurred in April. Sturgill was good friends with Mullins, and was critical of his relationship with Cornett. She had no history of violence nor a criminal record before April 1997.

==== Jason Bryant ====
Jason Blake Bryant, 14, was born July 18, 1982, in Hellier, Kentucky, had an IQ of 85, and the emotional and social skills of an 11-year-old. He had a history of alcohol and drug abuse, beginning as early as age 3, and was in the eighth grade at Millard High School in Pike County, Kentucky. He had met Cornett in Pikeville a month before the murders. Bryant was the youngest of the group, and was a legal minor at the time.

==== Karen Howell ====
Karen Renae Howell, 17, was born on September 25, 1979, in Delaware, Ohio. Her family moved to Kentucky when she was 3 years old, and her early childhood was characterized by constant fighting between her parents, until they divorced when she was 9 years old. She was recorded as having an IQ of 78, signifying "low" or "below average" intelligence. Howell revealed at the sentencing hearing that she had been sexually abused between the ages of 5 and 10 by her paternal uncle and a cousin (which they later admitted to authorities) and described herself as fearful of relationships. By the age of 13, she began mutilating herself. Howell lived with her mother until she was 14, and the relationship was stormy, as the two often fought. Howell had a history of struggling in school, illegal drug usage, runaway behavior, and an interest in witchcraft, which began with a ouija board and "automatic writing". Her mother discovered this, and brought in ministers who attempted to "cast out demons” from Howell. She also claimed that she had created "love spells" to get two boys to date her, and that she heard voices.

Howell moved in with her father briefly after her first semester of high school, although her father had rarely communicated with her. After she left school, she moved back in with her father and worked on earning her GED. By her early teens, she had begun abusing various drugs, particularly LSD. She claimed to have had a bad trip where she "half-heartedly" tried to chew her friend's arm off, but otherwise had no history of violence nor a criminal record prior to the murders. Howell reported that she had attempted suicide four times in the past, twice by cutting her wrists and twice by overdosing on drugs. She had met Cornett and Risner at school. Like Bryant, Howell was also a minor at the time of the crime, and was saving up to buy a car by babysitting full-time.

Howell was assigned David Leonard as her public defender. Leonard had never before worked a murder case.

== Plea bargain and sentencing hearing ==
During the sentencing hearing, Cornett said her first attorney coached her to say she was the "Daughter of Satan". District Attorney Berkeley Bell considered the Satanic angle a distraction (although he utilized occult experts during his investigation) and was relieved when Cornett's first attorney was replaced by the presiding judge. References were made by witnesses and prosecutors at trial to rumors that the six were involved with occultism and Satanism; however, no evidence of such involvement was presented. This omission was cited in Cornett's unsuccessful 2002 appeal of her conviction.

Bell has said in interviews that Bryant was the only one he could prove was a shooter, but he felt it would not be just unless he convicted all six of murder. Therefore, before jury selection was completed, a plea bargain was drawn up in which the death penalty was taken off the table if the six pleaded guilty to first-degree murder. However, Bell stipulated that all six defendants had to accept the deal and do so within a very short time period, or the death penalty would be pursued. Howell has stated for the record that she "wanted to fight it in court, even though I was not subject to the death penalty. But they were threatening to kill everyone if I didn't sign it. So I just caved in to the pressure."

All six defendants signed, and in March 1998, they were convicted of felony murder as participants in a felony kidnapping and carjacking that resulted in three murders and an attempted murder; each received three life sentences, one for each murder, and an additional 25 years for the attempted murder of Peter. The six youths were sentenced to life in prison with no possibility of parole. The judge applied the same aggravated circumstances for all. However, it was not determined which of them had the main blame for the killings. Court testimony by the other defendants was that the youngest, Bryant, had fired the shots, but the judge opined that another undetermined member of the group might also have done so.

Bryant admitted to Officer Deb Mackey in Arizona that he had shot Vidar. However, Mackey's testimony was not allowed, as Bryant had not been read his rights before he made the admission. He later changed his story, saying Mullins and Risner did the shooting.

=== Resentencing ===
In 2016, Bryant and Howell became eligible for resentencing due to Montgomery v. Louisiana.

== Aftermath ==
Soon after Peter Lillelid's medical condition stabilized at the end of April 1997, a custody battle began between his maternal grandmother, Lydia Selaya, in Miami, Florida, and his paternal aunt, Randi Heier, in Sweden. Citing Heier's pledge to raise Peter in the faith and teachings of the Jehovah's Witnesses as the deciding factor, local Judge Fred McDonald awarded her custody on July 1, 1997. Peter was adopted by Heier and her husband Odd, moved to Sweden and acquired his Swedish citizenship while retaining his American nationality, having renounced his Norwegian citizenship. He was then raised in Märsta, located in the Stockholm area, and, although he was still able to speak and understand English, he had learned to speak Swedish. As of 2007, when he was about to turn twelve, he still had trouble walking because of the injuries. By 2017, Peter had finished his IT education and was looking for work. In 2019, Peter moved back permanently to the United States after having had numerous visits over the years following the murders, to pursue a career in technology. He married in 2020, and he and his wife Caitlin live in Connecticut.

On August 24, 2001, Cornett and death row inmate Christa Pike allegedly attacked fellow prisoner Patricia Jones, strangling Jones nearly to death with a shoelace after Pike and Jones were placed in a holding cell with Cornett during a fire alarm. Although the Department of Corrections believed that Cornett was involved, investigators found insufficient evidence to charge her with helping Pike, who was subsequently found guilty of attempted murder.

Bell, the district attorney, has stated in several interviews that the six youths had planned a "killing spree" inspired by the popular film Natural Born Killers. Considering that the killing began and ended with the Lillelid family at Payne Hollow Lane, this theory is highly unlikely. Bell also insists that the bodies were "arranged in the shape of a cross," a statement refuted in an interview in "The Devil Came Knocking" podcast by Deputy Sheriff Frank Waddell, who was a first responder to the scene. Sheriff David Davenport voiced his opinion, stating the teens "were just trying to get the hell out of there", and did not try to arrange the bodies in any manner.

== Related news articles ==
- 20 Years Later: The Lillelid Murders, WBIR.com, 2017
- Lillelid Murderer Mullins' Sentence Review Is Heard, The Greeneville Sun, 2002
- Lillelid Murder Defendant Risner Seeks Reversal Of His Sentences, The Greeneville Sun, 2002
- Natasha Cornett Tells Why She Is Seeking A 'Fair Trial', The Greeneville Sun, 2001
- Peter Lillelid Is 'A Happy Little Boy' 3 Years After Murders Of His Family, The Greeneville Sun, 2000
- Lillelid murders still haunt East Tennessee, 20 years later, by Matt Lakin, USA Today, April 2, 2017
