= Helen Lenskyj =

Canadian sociologist and historian (born 1943)

- Born: April 15, 1943 (age 83); Sydney, Australia
- Occupations: Sociologist; historian

Academic background
- Education: University of Toronto
- Thesis: The role of physical education in the socialization of girls in Ontario, 1890–1930 (1983)

Academic work
- Discipline: Sport history
- Institutions: University of Toronto

Helen Jefferson Lenskyj (born April 15, 1943) is a Canadian sociologist and historian. Born and raised in Australia, she did graduate studies at the University of Toronto, where she then became a professor. Focusing on sport, gender, and the Olympic Games, her books include Out of Bounds: Women, Sport and Sexuality (1986), Inside the Olympic Industry (2000), Olympic Industry Resistance (2008), The Olympic Games (2020) and The Quest for Social Justice in Sport (2026).

== Biography ==
Lenskyj was born on April 15, 1943 in Sydney, Australia, to a working-class family of English and Scottish descent. Her great grandfather was a convict from Yorkshire who was exiled to the colony of Sydney in 1832, and her autobiography, "A Lot to Learn (2005)" documents her family history. She was educated at Kambala School and the Sydney Kindergarten Teachers' College, where she obtained her diploma in early childhood education in 1964.

After emigrating to Canada, she worked as an instructor and program supervisor for the Ministry of Culture and Recreation while studying at the University of Toronto, where she got a BA in 1977. After working as a college lecturer in Australia in 1978, she did graduate studies at UToronto, where she got a MA in 1981 and a PhD in 1983. Her doctoral dissertation was The role of physical education in the socialization of girls in Ontario, 1890–1930.

In 1986, she began working at UToronto's Ontario Institute for Studies in Education as a part-time instructor. She was promoted to associate professor in 1991 and full professor in 1997, before retiring in 2007. She also worked as a senior research officer at UToronto, as well as a research advisor for the government's Fitness and Amateur Sport Women's Program and a research network member for the Premier's Council on Health, Well-being, and Social Justice.

Her research focuses on women's sport and Olympic studies. She wrote several books on sport, including Out of Bounds: Women, Sport and Sexuality (1986), Inside the Olympic Industry (2000), The Best Ever Olympics: Social Impacts of Sydney 2000 (2002), Out on the Field (2003), and Olympic Industry Resistance (2008). She took a break from writing about the Olympics until hearing about Yelena Isinbayeva's remarks against pro-LGBT rainbow-coloured fingernails, inspiring her to write Sexual Diversity and the Sochi 2014 Olympics (2014). She has written three more books: Gender, Athletes’ Rights, and the Court of Arbitration for Sport (2018), The Olympic Games (2020), and The Quest for Social Justice in Sport (2025).

She was co-editor of the journal Resources for Feminist Research (1987–1990), as well as an editorial board member for Women in Sport and Physical Activity Journal (1993–1996) and Journal of Sport and Social Issues (1994–?). She won the 1990 Canadian Women & Sport Breakthrough Award for her work on the history of women's sport, as well as the 1991 Ontario Historical Society Riddell Award.

She is lesbian and became involved in LGBT activism, including with The ArQuives. She was an executive member for Canadian Women & Sport in 1985. In 2004, she was made a Toronto municipal Persons Day award recipient in connection to her women's rights activism.

She lives in Toronto.

== Bibliography ==
- Out of Bounds: Women, Sport and Sexuality (1986)
- Women, Sport, and Physical Activity: Research and Bibliography, Fitness and Amateur Sport (1988)
- Women, Sport, and Physical Activity: Selected Research Themes (1994)
- Inside the Olympic Industry (2000)
- The Best Ever Olympics: Social Impacts of Sydney 2000 (2002)
- Out on the Field (2003)
- A Lot to Learn (2005)
- Olympic Industry Resistance (2008)
- Sexual Diversity and the Sochi 2014 Olympics (2014)
- Gender, Athletes' Rights, and the Court of Arbitration for Sport (2018)
- The Olympic Games: A Critical Approach (2020)
- Justice for Trans Athletes: Challenges and Struggles (2022)
- Trans Athletes’ Resistance: The Struggle for Justice in Sport (2023)
- The Quest For Social Justice In Sport (2025)
