= Rafael Domingo Osle =

Spanish legal historian and philosopher

Rafael Domingo Oslé
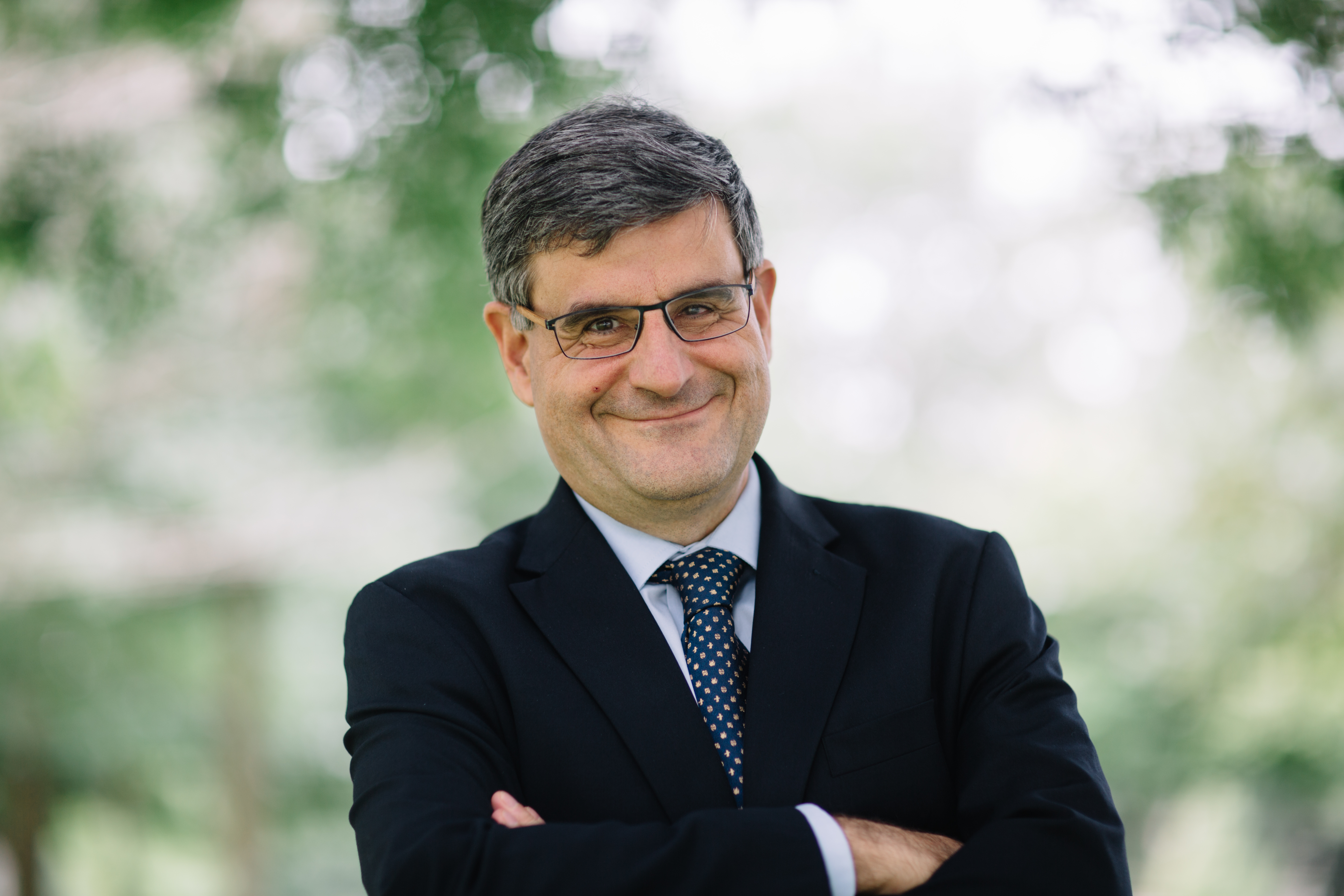
- Rafael Domingo Oslé in 2018
- Born: February 21, 1963 (age 63); Logroño, Spain
- Occupations: Legal scholar, professor
- Employer: University of Navarra
- Known for: Roman law, Global law, Law and Religion
- Title: Alvaro d'Ors Professor of Law
- Awards: Humboldt Research Award; Toribio Rodríguez de Mendoza Medal; Corresponding member, Austrian Academy of Sciences (1997); Corresponding member, Royal Academy of Moral and Political Sciences (2003); Corresponding member, Royal Academy of Jurisprudence and Legislation

Academic background
- Education: University of Navarra (PhD)

Rafael Domingo Oslé (born 1963) is a Spanish legal historian and professor of law. He holds the Álvaro d’Ors Professorship at the University of Navarra and is a Senior Fellow at the Center for the Study of Law and Religion at Emory University.

== Education and career ==
Domingo earned his PhD in law (1987) from the University of Navarra with highest honors. He began his teaching career as an assistant professor at the University of Navarra (1987–1989) before joining the University of Cantabria, where he was promoted to Associate Professor (1989) and subsequently to Professor of Law (1993).

In 1995, he returned to the University of Navarra as the successor to his mentor, Álvaro d'Ors. He served as the Vice Dean (1995–1996) and then as the Dean of the Law School from 1996 to 1999. During his tenure, he founded the Garrigues Chair in Global Law and established the Anglo-American Law Program.

He conducted post-doctoral research as an Alexander von Humboldt Fellow at LMU Munich. He has held visiting positions at Columbia University and Sapienza University of Rome. Since 2012, his research has focused on the intersection of global law and religion. Since 2018, he has also served as a visiting professor at the Strathmore University School of Law in Nairobi, Kenya.

== Legal philosophy and public impact ==
Domingo advocates for a "person-centered" global law paradigm. His 2010 book, The New Global Law, is cited as a foundational text in international legal theory.

As a public intellectual, he has been interviewed more than 40 times on CNN. His book Law and Religion in a Secular Age (2025) explores the harmony between secular and religious legal systems.

== Honors and recognition ==
- Austrian Academy of Sciences: Elected Corresponding Member (2024).
- Royal Academy of Jurisprudence and Legislation: Member (Madrid).
- Rafael Martínez Emperador Prize: Spanish Council of the Judiciary (2007).
- Toribio Rodríguez de Mendoza Medal of Honor: Constitutional Court of Peru (2006).
- Medal of Honor: Paraguayan Academy of Law (2009).
- Jose Barandiaran Medal of Honor: National University of San Marcos (2016).
- Honorary Doctorates: Inca Garcilaso de la Vega University (2012) and the University of Saint Ignatius of Loyola (2016).
- Vicente Ricaforte Medal: National Assembly of Ecuador (2019).

== Selected publications ==
- The New Global Law (Cambridge University Press, 2010).
- God and the Secular Legal System (Cambridge University Press, 2016).
- Roman Law: An Introduction (Routledge, 2018).
- The Oxford Handbook of Christianity and Law (Oxford University Press, 2024).
- Law and Religion in a Secular Age (CUA Press, 2025).
