= Fictosexuality =

Attraction to fictional characters

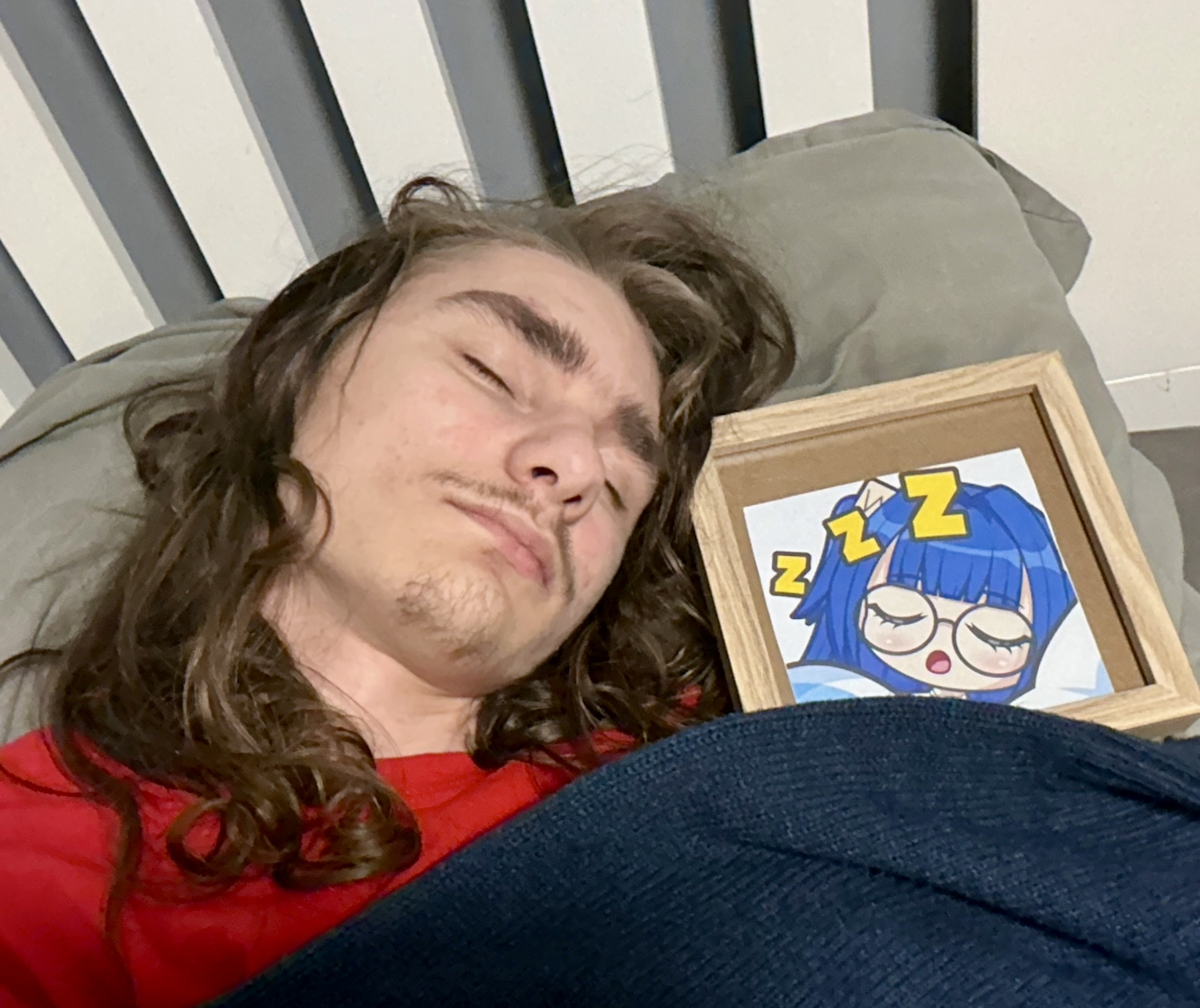
- A man sleeping next to a framed drawing of Wiktionary-chan, a moe personification of Wiktionary
- Definition: Attraction to fictional characters
- Classification: Sexual identity
- Parent category: Asexuality

Other terms
- Associated terms: Aegosexuality; Gray asexuality; object sexuality

Fictosexuality and fictoromanticism (with fictophilia as an umbrella term) are sexual and romantic attraction towards fictional characters in media, as distinct from living people in real life.

Asexuals and aromantics have used the terms as sexual and romantic identity labels for those who only experience attraction to fictional characters and not to real people. The Japanese term nijikon ('2D complex') describes attraction to two-dimensional characters in anime and manga.

Fictosexuals may face discrimination or marginalization. As a result, some have formed social movements to combat normative beliefs they call "human-oriented sexualism" and "humanogenderism". In 2019, the first fictosexual advocacy group was established in Taiwan.

== History of the term ==
The term "fictosexuality" originated within the asexual community. The earliest confirmed use of the term is a post from 2005 on the forum of AVEN (Asexuality Visibility and Education Network), an online community for asexual people. The original poster described themselves as engaging in sexual fantasies and masturbation but having no desire for sexual intercourse in real life, coining the term "fictosexual" to denote this condition.

This usage was later introduced to the Japanese sphere, where "fictosexual" began to be used online around 2017. Subsequently, in 2020, the term gained wider traction after a web article featured a woman who "married" a two-dimensional character, identifying her as "fictosexual." This event reinforced the common image of fictosexuality as involving "romantic relationships" or "marriage" with characters. Scholars have suggested that this shift in popular understanding reflects the deep-rooted nature of amatonormativity in society.

== Human-oriented sexualism and humanogenderism ==
The term used to describe the marginalization of fictosexuality is "human-oriented sexualism" (ja:対人性愛中心主義 (taijin-seiai-chūshin-shugi)) and "humanogenderism". Human-oriented sexualism is the expectation that sexual attraction towards flesh-and-blood human is "normal" sexuality. Humanogenderism is "the idea that legitimate gender is instantiated or materialized by humans as a biological species" and is "the assumption that genders instantiated by non-human beings are 'less material' or 'mere representations'." While these concept is raised from fictosexuality studies in Japan, it is now being discussed in research outside of Japan and in areas other than fictosexuality studies.

"Human-oriented sexuality" (対人性愛 (taijin-seiai) is the term referring to the sexual majority attracted to flesh-and-blood people. This term emerged from grassroots usage among those who prefer two-dimensional sexual creations like manga and anime, yet lack sexual attraction to flesh-and-blood individuals. Based on this premise, the term "human-oriented sexualism" was coined, prompting inquiries into institutions, customs, and value judgments rooted in human-oriented sexuality.

According to Yuu Matsuura, human-oriented sexualism and humanogenderism are linked to heteronormativity and cisgenderism. In terms of queer theory, they are components that constitute what Judith Butler calls "literalizing fantasy" and are an example of what Karen Barad terms "representationalism." Human-oriented sexualism forecloses the possibility of articulating sexuality in ways other than the heterosexual/homosexual distinction, and in that sense, it is a precondition for the exclusion of homosexuality. Furthermore, humanogenderism is a kind of biological essentialism that seeks to ground gender in the "anatomical" body and is connected to ideologies that exclude transgender people.

Kazuki Fujitaka, associate professor of feminist/queer studies at Kyoto Sangyo University, highly appreciated Matsuura's theory about critique against human-oriented sexualism and described the theory as "a practice of healing those who get hurt by a normative society and of defamiliarizing the world," akin to what bell hooks calls "theory as liberatory practice."

== Marginalization, discrimination, and stigmatization ==
Fictosexuals have been marginalized or concealed in societies that adhere to the norm of sexual attraction to human beings. They are occasionally stigmatized or pathologized. Through interviews with fictosexual individuals, Matsuura discovered that they face similar forms of oppression due to compulsory sexuality as asexual individuals. Furthermore, it was observed that sexual desire does not always entail a desire for sexual intercourse. Just as not all allosexuals desire sexual contact, some fictosexual individuals do not desire interactive relationships with fictional characters. Matsuura's research indicates that these individuals are rendered invisible under amatonormativity. Interview surveys suggest that the practices of fictosexual individuals offer possibilities to challenge compulsory sexuality and human-oriented sexualism.

According to Elizabeth Miles, some activists have labeled the sexuality only attracted to manga/anime fictional characters as a "third sexual orientation," and she argues that "it is the criticism of non-real-world sex, sex outside a flesh-and-blood relationship, which drives much contemporary anti-pornography criticism and activism". Matsuura criticizes accusations that ACG pornography sexualizes women and children, arguing that these claims presuppose human-oriented sexualism and humanogenderism. According to Matsuura, human-oriented sexualism and humanogenderism are structural problems that enable the sexualization of women and children by ACG pornography, while simultaneously erasing the existence of fictosexuality. Therefore, Matsuura suggests that fictosexuals and feminists should unite in solidarity to criticize human-oriented sexualism and humanogenderism.

== Research ==
=== Demographic research ===
According to the "8th National Survey of Adolescent Sexual Behavior" conducted by the Japanese Association for Sex Education in 2017, the percentage of respondents who reported "having had romantic feelings for a game or anime character" was as follows: 13.1% of male junior high school students, 16.0% of female junior high school students, 13.6% of male high school students, 15.4% of female high school students, 14.4% of male university students, and 17.1% of female university students.

=== Relationship with fictional characters ===
Fictosexuality and fictoromance are occasionally regarded as a form of parasocial relationship in media studies and game studies. Hsi-wen Liao claims that research on parasocial relationships often centers on unidirectional attachment from the audience to the character, thereby overlooking the intricate and diverse relationships between fictosexuals or fictoromantics, and fictional characters. According to a research by Yuu Matsuura, some aegosexual individuals identify as fictosexual to emphasize their preference for fictional objects of attraction.

=== Queer studies ===
Several studies on asexuality and introductory books on sexual minorities refer to fictosexuality. Elizabeth Miles and Yuu Matsuura conduct research on people who are sexually attracted only to fictional characters and argue that such sexuality, like asexuality, prompts reconsideration of dominant ideas about sexuality.

Sociologist and queer theorist Yuu Matsuura has theorized how fictosexuals who love two-dimensional sexual creations, such as manga and anime, engage in a subversion of dominant norms in a manner distinct from Butlerian performativity. Matsuura draws on Teri Silvio's concept of "animation," Hiroki Azuma's interpretation of Derrida, and Karen Barad's theory of posthumanist performativity. This subversion is described as "transforming modes of perception and forms of desire by constructing beings of a previously nonexistent category through animation." Such subversion arises from "the materialization of gender in a way that differs from the live human body."

== Community and activism ==
Online communities and forums about fictosexuality exist. In Taiwan, Hsi-wen Liao founded Taiwan Entrepot of Fictosexuality, a fictosexual activist organization in solidarity with feminist bookstores and LGBTQ activists.

In June 2023, Japanese school administrator Akihiko Kondo, who identifies as a fictosexual, founded the General Incorporated Association of Fictosexuality to provide comfort to fictosexuals, hold meetings with people that have similar views, and improve the understanding of the subject. Izumi Tsuji, secretary of the Japan Youth Study Group at Chuo University, where he is a sociology of culture professor, described Kondo as "a pioneer for the fictosexual movement".

In 2024, Yuu Matsuura founded the awareness organization Fictosexual Perspective in Japan to archive experiences and thoughts of fictosexual individuals.

== Cultural representation ==
The symbolic marriage of Akihiko Kondo to Hatsune Miku in 2018 was widely covered by various media outlets worldwide.

In 2025, Japanese novelist Sayaka Murata publicly stated, "fictosexuality is very strong in me." In her novel Vanishing World, she depicted "a world in which aspects of polyamory, asexuality, aromanticism, and fictosexuality... become the shaping tendencies in a new structuring of human relationships."

== See also ==
- Aegosexuality – Disconnect of the target of sexual arousal from the self
- Anthropomorphism – Attribution of human traits to non-human entities
- Demisexuality – Only experiencing secondary sexual attraction
- Moe-phobia – Aspect of discrimination against otaku
- Nijikon – Attraction to two-dimensional characters
- Objectophilia – Sexual or romantic attraction towards objects
- Shipping (fandom) – Relationship created or desired by fans
- Waifu – Fictional character that one feels attraction to
