= Discrimination against otaku =

Social issue in Japan

Discrimination against otaku (オタク差別; lit. "otaku discrimination") refers to social exclusion, prejudice, and hatred of otaku. It is also referred to as "anti-otaku sentiment" or "anti-otaku discrimination".

In regions outside Japan, discrimination against otaku is closely related to cultural anti-Japanese sentiment.

== Overview ==
The term otaku has been used as a negative term since it was first employed by Akio Nakamori in 1983, carrying nuances such as "those who are underdeveloped in sexual communication or romance," an "insular" personality, and a "dorky" appearance. In 1984, Eiji Otsuka criticized Nakamori's "otaku" theory as being discriminatory. In 1989, the Little Girl Murders, triggered a moral panic about "otaku", with the word spreading through society as a derogatory term and a form of pathology.

The discourse on anti-otaku discrimination often intersects with legal and ethical debates regarding lolicon. While legal frameworks in many jurisdictions focus on the potential social harm of animated sexual content involving minors, some researchers argue that these critiques can overlap with broader anti-otaku sentiment. Japanese feminist and queer researcher Yu Matsuura a proposes a sociological framework to analyze this tension. Matsuura contends that prioritizing "object-oriented love" (desire for flesh-and-blood humans) as a universal norm—a concept she terms "human-oriented sexualism" (対人性愛中心主義)—can lead to the marginalization of "Nijikon" (two-dimensional love). From this perspective, she suggests that conventional critiques may inadvertently reinforce discriminatory structures when they "fail to distinguish between fictional expression and actual interpersonal harm." Matsuura further notes that this issue is not exclusive to any single political camp, arguing that both feminist and anti-feminist positions can at times lack consistency in their defense or critique of otaku media.

In the late 1990s and 2000s, the public perception of otaku improved, and the personality elements previously included in otaku became differentiated into "hikikomori" (recluses) and "hi-mote" (非モテ; lit. "unpopular"). In addition, manga and anime became more popular and otaku became considered common. Sociologists Izumi Tsuji and Daisuke Okabe call this "otaku normalization".

== History ==
=== 1980s–1990s ===
In 1983, the concept of otaku became known through Akio Nakamori's columns. While initially mocking, fans adopted the term as a self-deprecating identity. During the 1980s, minority hobbies like anime were targets of disdain and negative stereotypes.

The Little Girl Murders led to intense "otaku bashing." Mass media linked the perpetrator Tsutomu Miyazaki's collection of videos and manga to his crimes, establishing the perception of "otaku as potential criminals." During this period, "otaku" was considered a banned word in television broadcasting. In the 1990s, this atmosphere led to movements for regulating manga and games, such as the Harmful Comics Controversy that saw a movement to ban certain manga deemed harmful.

=== 2000s ===
In the early 2000s, the popularity of the novel Densha Otoko and the wider use of the word of "moe" gradually improved the social image of otaku. The Japanese government also began to emphasize otaku as subjects of the Cool Japan soft power strategy. By 2007, surveys showed that otaku were becoming more accepted, though negative impressions remained.

In the wake of the murder of Kaede Ariyama in 2004, commentator Akihiro Otani coined the term "Figure moe zoku (otaku who collect figurines)" to label those who collect anime figurines as potential criminals. Otani claimed he did not mean to blame otaku for the murder.

=== 2010s–Present ===
In the 2010s, as otaku content became mainstream, disputes over content rating intensified. Critics like Lincoln Michel argue that since otaku culture is now mainstream, their tendency to "play the victim" is problematic.

Politically, the Liberal Democratic Party (LDP) has actively incorporated the otaku vote, with candidates like Taro Yamada and Ken Akamatsu winning large numbers of votes by opposing limitations on the freedom of expression. This has led to friction with liberal and feminist groups, resulting in the derogatory term "Freedom of expression warrior" (hyōgen no jiyū senshi).

In 2019, blood donation posters featuring Uzaki-chan Wants to Hang Out! were criticized as "environmental sexual harassment," which some viewed as a form of otaku bashing.

== Moe-phobia ==
Moe-phobia (萌えフォビア) is the discrimination, prejudice, or fear against a sexuality that desires fictional characters themselves. It arises under the social norm that sexual desire should be directed toward real-life humans ("human-oriented sexualism").

It manifests as an aversion toward people who desire two-dimensional (2D) characters, or toward works depicting 2D characters themselves. Examples include the mindset of viewing attraction to non-real human entities as "shameful" or "abnormal." It can also manifest as a denial that one could possibly be sexually attracted to non-real human entities. Some claim it also involves "the equating of affection for fictional characters resembling minors with real-world child sexual abuse or pedophilia, reinforcing cultural stigmas against otaku subcultures."

Although it is a concept proposed by manga researcher Gō Itō, in queer studies, it is evaluated as a pioneering concept for understanding discrimination against fictosexuality. Furthermore, some feminism and queer studies have claimed moe-phobia is linked to transphobia.

=== Proposal by Gō Itō ===
Itō initially used this concept to refer to how the first generation of otaku "cynically distance themselves from 'moe' despite actually experiencing it, using phrases like 'animalization is just pathetic,' 'moe is embarrassing,' or 'those who experience moe are losers,'" or as an "escape from the self-awareness of 'me experiencing moe.'"

However, Itō later stated, "If we extend the manifestation of phobic behavior to the 'denial' of desire (...) in my view, moe-phobia can also be found in attitudes that definitively label 'moe' toward characters who look like young girls as pedophilia, without mediation or restriction, and attempt to exclude them from society."

Itō discusses the "psychological mechanism" of moe-phobia based on an examination of manga reading experiences rooted in manga expression theory. According to Itō, "moe" is something that "is established at the boundary between 'manga ghosts'—the reality possessed by the character iconography itself—and 'rabbit ghosts'—the reality resulting from the representation of the body."

=== Queer studies ===
Feminist and queer researcher Yuu Matsuura stated that moe-phobia is linked to transphobia, while calling the social structure behind moe-phobia human-oriented sexualism.

According to Matsuura, behind moe-phobia lies humanogenderism, which is "the idea that legitimate gender is exemplified or substantiated by humans as a biological species," and human-oriented sexualism, which regards sexuality with humans as the normative sexuality.

== Criticism ==
Some critics argue that "anti-otaku discrimination" does not exist and is merely a rhetoric used to attack liberals and leftists (which has to do with the stereotype that otaku is alt-right/Netto-uyoku). Tsukasa Shirakawa, a member of the conservative LDP, referred to anti-feminist otaku who support the sexual objectification of underage girls prevalent in anime/manga as "Moe conservatives" (萌え系保守)—people who dislike feminism but love characters with large breasts—and distinguished them from "established conservatives" (従来の保守).

Naoya Fujita argues that since "otaku" is not an innate attribute, it cannot be a subject of discrimination. Yoshiaki Kiyoshi points out the discrimination is really against "Herbivore men" rather than the hobbies themselves.
