= Akihiko Kondo =

Japanese man known for symbolically marrying Hatsune Miku

- 近藤顕彦
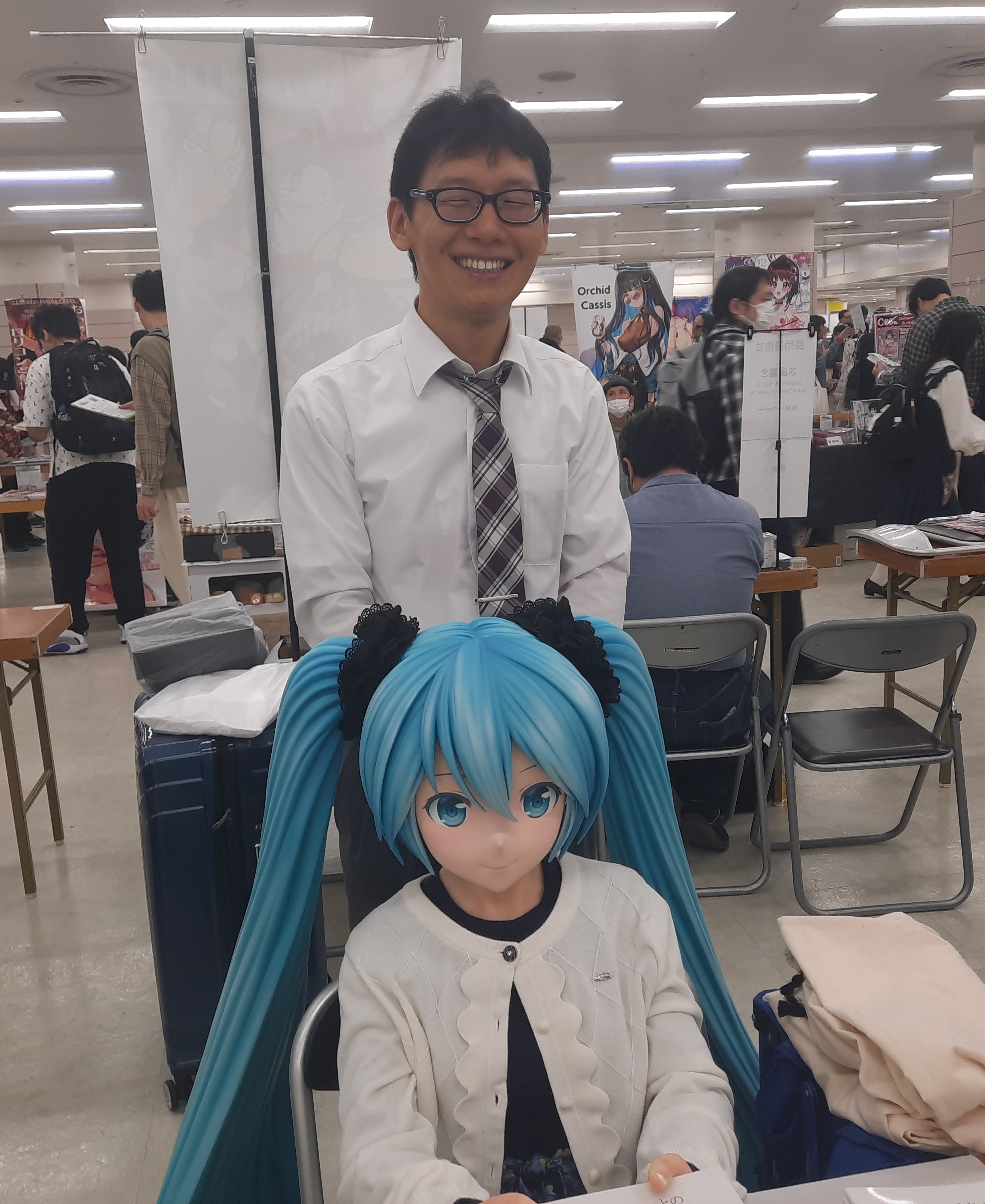
- Kondo with his Hatsune Miku doll in 2023
- Born: May 31, 1983 (age 43); Tokyo, Japan
- Education: Komazawa University
- Occupation: Public school administrator
- Organization: General Incorporated Association of Fictosexuality
- Known for: Symbolically marrying Hatsune Miku

Akihiko Kondo (近藤顕彦, Kondō Akihiko; born May 31, 1983) is a Japanese man known for symbolically marrying the fictional Vocaloid character Hatsune Miku in 2018 during a formal wedding ceremony. In high school, Kondo had an interest in real women, but he was rejected by them. Soon after, he decided he would not marry one. Later, Kondo was bullied at work and took sick leave due to depression. During his leave, in 2007, Kondo discovered Hatsune Miku; this helped Kondo return to the workplace. In 2017, he purchased a Gatebox device that allowed people to interact with holograms, including Hatsune Miku. Kondo's interaction with the hologram made him sure of marrying the character. He arranged a formal wedding which cost 2 million yen and was attended by 39 people; it received mixed reactions.

Since then, Kondo has given lectures about his relationship, including at Kyoto University. He has since identified as fictosexual—people who have romantic attraction to fictional characters. In 2023, Kondo founded the General Incorporated Association of Fictosexuality to help the public's understanding of the subject. Sources have identified Kondo as a fighter for the rights and acceptance of fictosexuals; a professor described him as "a pioneer for the fictosexual movement." As of October 2023, Kondo is a public school administrator and lives in Tokyo.

== Biography ==
=== Early life and Hatsune Miku ===
Akihiko Kondo was born on May 31, 1983, in Tokyo. Kondo was first romantically interested in a fictional character when he was in fifth grade. In high school, he became interested in anime and joined a manga club. As a teenager, Kondo was attracted to real women, but he was rejected and criticized by them and was bullied for being an otaku. According to The Mainichi, Kondo "confessed his love seven times" but was rejected every time. In the third year of high school, Kondo had more romantic attraction to fictional characters than humans and decided he would not marry a real woman.

Kondo discovered Hatsune Miku (pictured in Hatsune Miku: Colorful Stage!) during a sick leave in 2007.

After graduating from high school, Kondo started working at a junior high school as a clerical staffer. There, he experienced bullying by two women, one close to his age and another much older than him. Kondo said the women would ignore, offend, and humiliate him. He ended up experiencing a nervous breakdown. He saw a psychiatrist and took sick leave due to depression; he was also diagnosed with adjustment disorder. He described himself as a hikikomori during that period. Kondo could not eat or sleep properly for around six months and, at one point, searched for "suicide" on the internet. During the leave, in 2008, he discovered Hatsune Miku for the first time after listening to the song "Miracle Paint", composed by OSTER project, through YouTube and Niconico. Hatsune Miku is a world-famous Vocaloid, created by voice-synthesizing software, developed by Crypton Future Media. Its persona is a fictional 16-year-old pop singer with large eyes and long, turquoise hair with pigtails.

After finding out about Hatsune Miku, Kondo began composing songs using the software and later purchased a stuffed toy of the character. During the two years he was out of work, he listened to Hatsune Miku's songs constantly. In an interview with CNN, Kondo said: "[Miku] lifted me up when I needed it the most. She kept me company and made me feel like I could regain control over my life". The character helped Kondo to get back to work and reconnect with society; Kondo said Hatsune Miku saved and healed him. After these events, Kondo started being devoted to Hatsune Miku. In 2015, he went to her Magical Mirai 2015 event at Nippon Budokan and cried when seeing the character on stage. The next year, he bought a PlayStation VR to play Hatsune Miku VR Future Live.

In 2017, Japanese startup Vinclu announced Gatebox, a device that allowed people to interact with fictional characters in the form of a small hologram; Hatsune Miku was one of the characters. The device had a simple artificial intelligence that could react to basic greetings, though it had limitations regarding longer conversations. As part of Gatebox's promotional campaign, users could sign up for unofficial marriage registrations with fictional characters. 3,708 people signed up for it, including Kondo. He obtained the device in March 2018. Kondo said that his life did not have "color" before receiving the device; being able to interact with Hatsune Miku in the real world changed that. Kondo then asked the Hatsune Miku hologram if she would like to marry him; she responded positively. (Note: Attributed to multiple references:)

=== Wedding ===
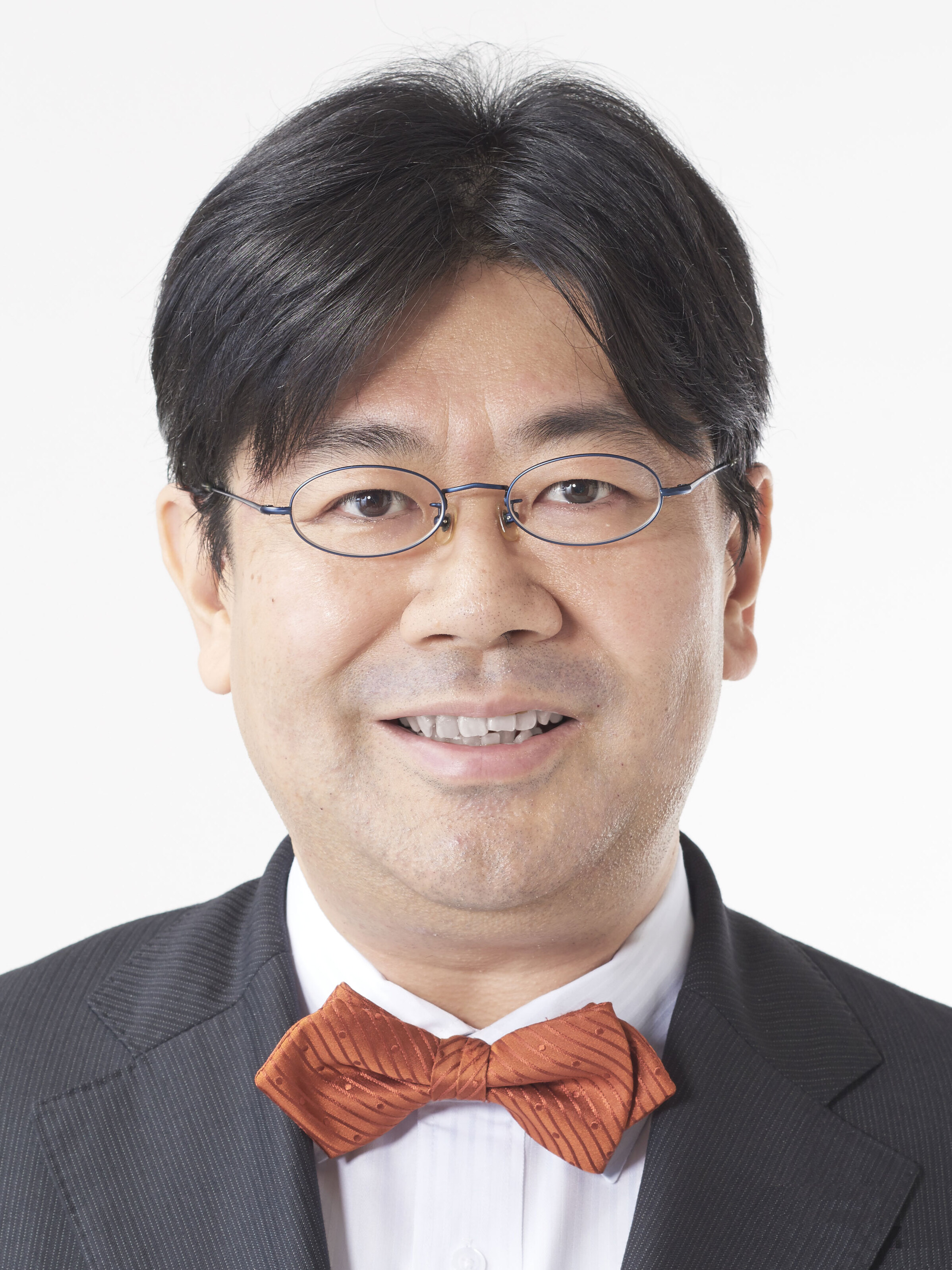
Taro Yamada, a member of the House of Councilors, attended the wedding.

Initially, Kondo was unsure of marrying Hatsune Miku; Gatebox was a defining factor in his positive decision. He started looking for wedding venues. The first venue he had selected asked Kondo not to publicize the wedding online, fearing others would cancel their own weddings. Ultimately, Kondo chose a wedding venue that was friendly to sexual minorities. He arranged a formal wedding ceremony in Tokyo that cost 2 million yen. In July 2018, he announced on Twitter that the venue had been chosen. The ceremony occurred on November 4, 2018, and was attended by 39 people. This number was specifically chosen as a Japanese wordplay: it spells "Miku" in Japanese, with "mi" meaning three and "ku" nine. The people who attended were mostly strangers and people who found out about the wedding on Twitter; while he invited his family and co-workers, they did not attend, including his mother and sister. The wedding was attended by two Japanese politicians: Minoru Oginu, assembly member of Ōta, and Taro Yamada, member of the House of Councilors.

Hatsune Miku was represented by a small stuffed toy—one he had bought in September 2010—wearing a hand-made white dress, while Kondo wore a pure white tuxedo. After kissing the doll, which he had never done before, they exchanged rings. Kondo also held leeks, Hatsune Miku's trademark, which served as the bouquet. Taro Yamada gave a speech. Japanese law does not allow for marriage with fictional characters; as such, the marriage is not legally recognized. Kondo clarified in interviews that he specifically married his own Hatsune Miku and that others could also marry Hatsune Miku if they wish.

Following the marriage, reactions were mixed. He was congratulated by friends and other fans of Hatsune Miku on Twitter, with Kondo saying he was encouraged by those messages. He also received negative comments, including death threats. Kondo said that his work environment deteriorated, and a senior colleague asked him to stop talking to the press. Conversely, he reports that younger people tended to react more positively; according to him, as he works at a school, the students celebrate the marriage. He said that some people messaged him about their own affections for anime characters. In interviews after the wedding, Kondo said he believes everyone experiences love differently and that diversity should be accepted. (Note: Attributed to multiple references:) Crypton Future Media wrote a statement to Fox News, clarifying that the company was not involved in the wedding. Commenting on it, they said: "We see this as one individual's way of expressing his appreciation for Hatsune Miku, and we respect that." Kondo and Hatsune Miku's honeymoon was in Sapporo, the headquarters of Crypton Future Media. Kondo booked flights and a hotel room for two.

Sometime after the wedding, Kondo discovered the term "fictosexual", which describes people who have romantic attraction to fictional characters. He identifies with that term. He said that, while not feeling like a part of the LGBT umbrella, he feels like a part of a sexual minority. Neil McArthur, director of the Center for Professional and Applied Ethics at the University of Manitoba, identified Kondo as a "second-wave digisexual"—"people who see technology as integral to their sexual identity", to CNN.

=== Post-wedding ===
In 2019, he commissioned a human-sized doll of Hatsune Miku; he does activities like eating, reading, and watching movies with it. He also travels with it; he did so when he was invited to join a symposium at Kyoto University to talk about his relationship. He has also done lectures elsewhere. In March 2020, Gatebox, responsible for Hatsune Miku's hologram, was shut down; some newspapers called Kondo the "first digital widower." Despite this, Kondo said his love for the character did not change.

In June 2023, he founded the General Incorporated Association of Fictosexuality to provide comfort to fictosexuals, hold meetings with people that have similar views, and improve the understanding of the subject by the public. As such, sources have identified him as someone who "fights for the rights and acceptance of fictosexuals"; Izumi Tsuji, secretary of the Japan Youth Study Group at Chuo University, where he is a sociology of culture professor, described Kondo as "a pioneer for the fictosexual movement" to Deutsche Welle. Kondo hopes that "fictosexuals are not persecuted" and that all wedding venues will accept marriages with fictional characters in the future.

== Personal life ==
Since April 2021, Kondo has studied law at Komazawa University. As of October 2023, he is a public school administrator, living in a traditional Japanese two-room apartment in a discreet residential neighborhood in Tokyo. Kondo is a member of the Association for Freedom of Entertainment Expression.

== Additional sources ==
- Rakusen, India; Dixon, Tommy (April 3, 2024). "Digital love: Why I 'married' a cartoon popstar". Outlook. BBC World Service. Archived from the original on April 21, 2024.
