= Anti-censorship =

Social movement opposed to censorship

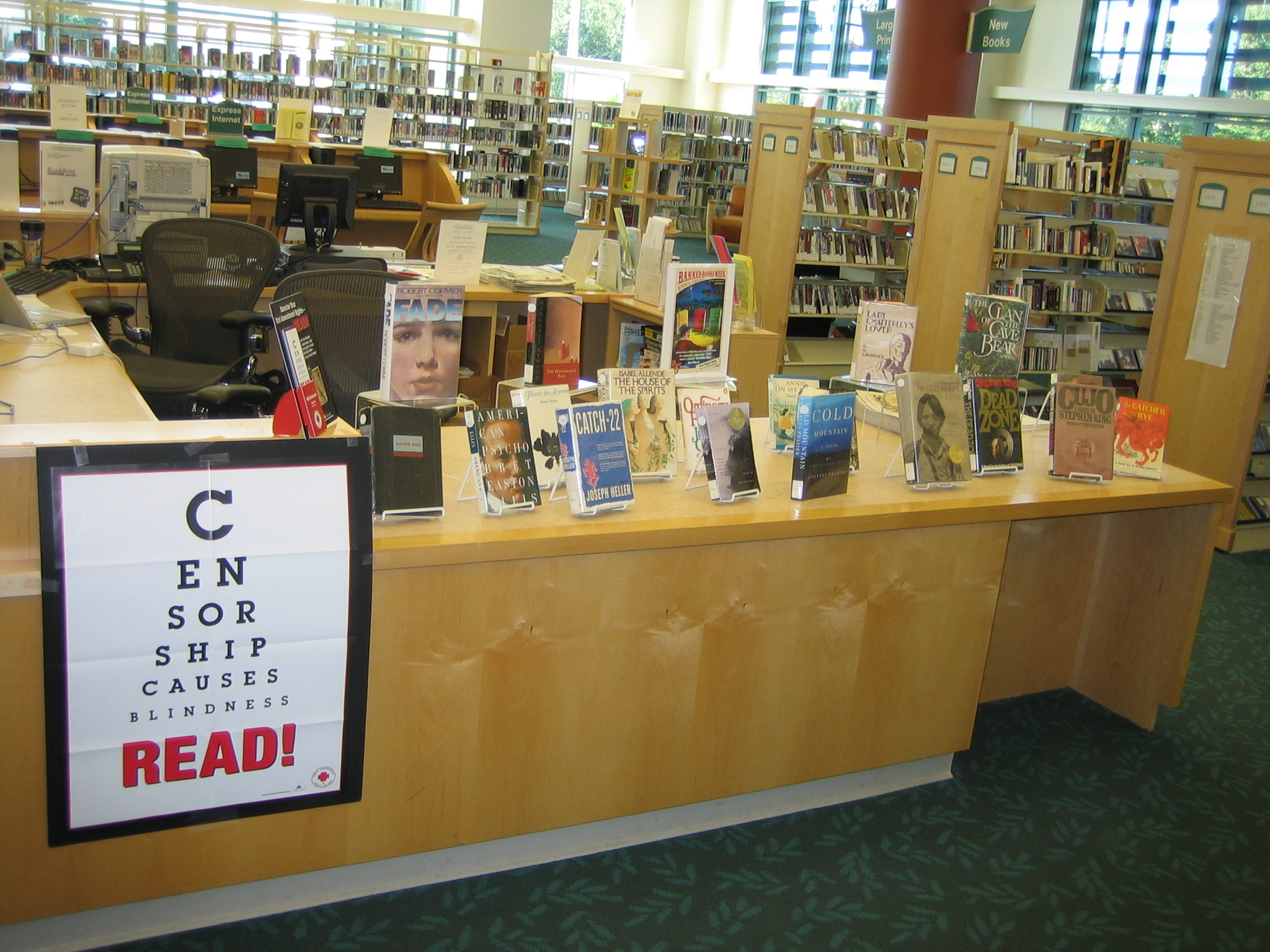
The 2006 slogan for Banned Books Week was "Censorship Causes Blindness".

Anti-censorship is a stance opposed to censorship. Anti-censorship is motivated by philosophical, ethical, political, or religious beliefs.

== Concept ==
Anti-censorship movement is based on the idea that censorship of information and ideas is incompatible with a free society in which individuals pursue happiness. Early modern writers such as John Locke, John Milton, Voltaire, Adam Smith, and Alexis de Tocquevillee advocated anti-censorship as a means of resisting autocracy. The Areopagitica is known as a major text from that period.

Criticism of censorship is directed not only at the state but also at corporations such as Big Tech, and can come from both the political right and the left. Anti-censorship is carried out in the context of defending political freedom of speech, freedom of artistic expression in popular culture such as video games, or civil liberties in sensitive media such as pornography.

== History ==
During the feminist sex wars of the 1980s, sex-positive feminists established a Feminist Anti-Censorship Task Force to oppose censorship of pornography.

The Prison Policy Initiative, the American Civil Liberties Union (ACLU), and the American Booksellers Association, among others, run the Prison Ban Practice, which opposes censorship in prisons.

In 2025, gamers and game publishers protested financial censorship by Visa and Mastercard on Steam and itch.io. In 2026, Telegram CEO Pavel Durov called on Russian citizens to stockpile VPNs to counter censorship.

== See also ==
- Association for Freedom of Entertainment Expression
- National Coalition Against Censorship
- Free-culture movement
