= Moegaku =

英語イディオム50日「萌える学習キット～もえがく～」
- Developer: Studio Sagittarius
- Publisher: JP: Ask Co., Ltd.
- Series: Moegaku
- Platform: Windows ME
- Release: JP: 25 November 2005
- Mode: Single player

Moegaku (もえがく) is a series of English language study adventure games for PC and PSP developed by Studio Sagittarius. Based on the concept that was made popular by the Moetan series of English wordbooks, it tries to spark the interest of the player for language-learning with cute, moe characters and a setting that should feel familiar to otaku.

Enhanced version of the game included idiom cards, audio CD, metal charm pen.

In January 2008, it was adapted into the television show Moegaku★5. It aired on BS Fuji Monday-Friday, and was hosted by voice actress Aya Hirano.

== Story ==
One day, Kyoka Akira told Tukishima Moe he would study in United States. Although Moe wanted Akira to stay, Moe had poor English skills. Responding to Moe's wish Lulue appeared to help Moe. Using the transformation item given by Megamisama, she must battle against rival magical girls, by chanting in English to cast spells. Unfortunately, Moe's English was poor. However, Emily was willing to train Moe with English. In order for Moe and Akira to study together, Moe must prepare for the final battle taking place 50 days later.

== Game play ==
The game uses branched story in the adventure mode. Everyday Moe was taught how to cast spell using English chants. In every 10 days, a quiz appears. The success of English tests affect the endings.

== Moegaku@Portable ==
もえがく@ポータブル (Moegaku@Portable)
- Developer: Studio Sagittarius
- Publisher: JP: Idea Factory
- Series: Moegaku
- Platform: PSP
- Release: JP: 14 September 2006
- Mode: Single player

It is a PSP port of the original video game.

== Motto, Moegaku ==
もっと、もえがく (Motto, Moegaku) (Taiwan) 萌學戀愛
- Developer: Studio Sagittarius
- Publisher: JP: CyberFront Corporation
- Series: Moegaku
- Platform: Windows 2000
- Release: JP: 21 March 2008
- Mode: Single player

It is the enhanced version of the 2005 PC game. New features include:

- Video game debut of Megamisama.
- Transformation scene is added.
- 30 bonus sample questions, for a total 100.
- Adjustable difficulty.
- Windows Vista support.

Japan Sofmap order came with telephone card.

Taiwan version included Tukishima Moe's Love White Book (月島萌的戀愛白皮書) novel.

== Moegaku★5 ==
- Moegaku

もえがく
- Genre: Magical Girl
- Anime television series

もえがく★5 (Moegaku★5)
- Studio: AIC Spirits
- Original network: BS Fuji
- Original run: January 14, 2008 – March 3, 2008
- Episodes: 8

A television series based on the video game was produced, titled Moegaku★5. The 5 came from the use of 5 languages and its 5 PM broadcast schedule.

The series further the original concept by expanded language study to include Korean, Spanish, Chinese, and French.

Each 15-episode was structured to include 7-minute animation segment and total of 4.5 minutes for live action segment. Live action segment features cast members of the series, and tutorials.

The weekly schedule was arranged to broadcast English, Korean, Spanish, Chinese, and French-themed episodes in Monday, Tuesday, Wednesday, Thursday, and Friday, respectively. A marathon run of 5 episodes took place on Sunday.

=== Story ===
A Tokyo school girl named Tukishima Moe obtains the ability of becoming a magical girl with the help of Lulue. Her duty is to protect Akihabara, the source of moe energy, from falling into the evil hands.

== Characters ==
- Tukishima Moe: Ouka high school 2nd year student.
- Lulue: Moe's guardian.
- Mush: In TV series, Mush was banished from magical kingdom, and decided to seek revenge using the energy in Akihabara. Mush turned Kaori into magical girl as part of the plan.
- Emily: An American UCLA student. She relied on animation and video game to study Japanese.
- Kyoka Kaori: Seirei high school 2nd year student. She became a magical girl when Mush discovered her, and became Moe's nemesis.
- Orishima Yuzu: Ouka high school 2nd year student and Moe's friend.
- Senna Mayu: Ouka high school 2nd year student and Moe's friend. In TV series, she first appeared in episode 7.
- Kamishima Madoka: English teacher.
- Kyoka Akira

=== TV series characters ===
- Megamisama: The goddess that bestowed power to Moe.
- American otaku
- Korean otaku
- Spain otaku
- Chinese otaku
- French otaku
- Yugi Moto

== See also ==
- Moetan
