= Waifu =

Fictional character that one feels attraction to

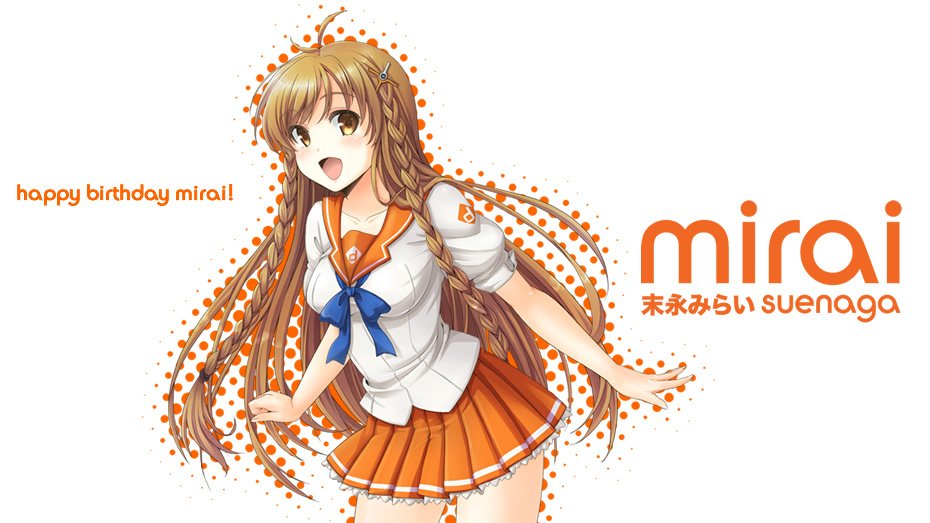
An illustration of a female anime character, representative of the type of characters commonly referred to as waifus by fans

Waifu (/ˈwaɪ.fuː/, WY-foo) is a term used to refer to a fictional female character toward whom one feels romantic or sexual attraction. Husbando (/hʌz.ˈbæn.doʊ/, huz-BAN-doh) is the male equivalent of waifu. While the term waifu was derived from a scene of the 2002 anime Azumanga Daioh and husbando emerged later as its male equivalent, both terms from the anime and manga fandom have been adopted by various other online media communities to refer to any characters toward whom fans feel romantic or sexual attraction.

The waifu phenomenon is a form of parasocial relationship where individuals develop genuine emotional attachments to fictional characters. As of 2025, approximately 38% of anime fans report having a waifu or husbando. Modern generative AI chatbots also allow fans to interact with digital representations of their waifus, especially through virtual, extended, and augmented reality.

== History ==
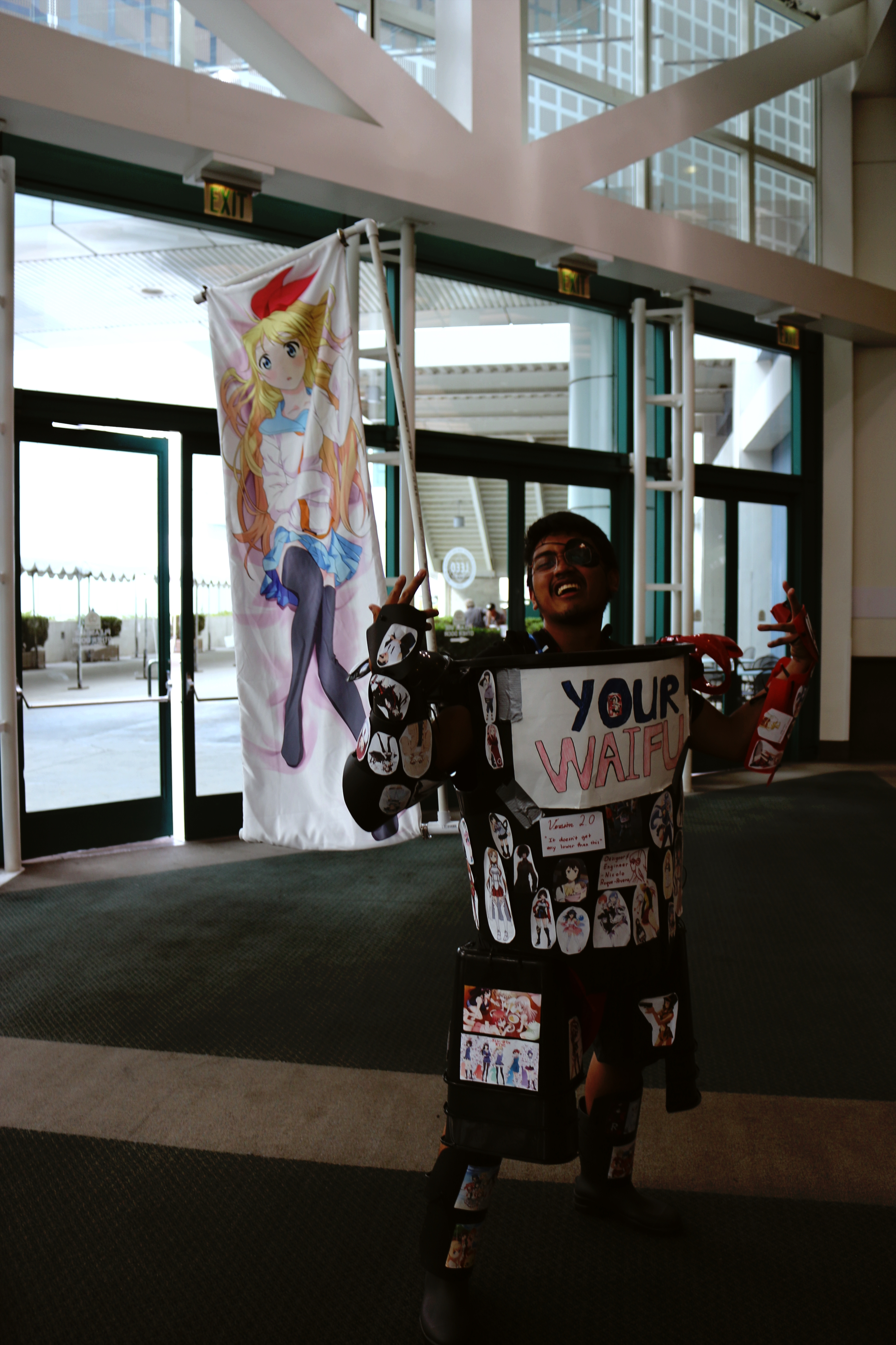
A cosplayer at Anime Expo 2016 dressed up as a trash can for Chitoge Kirisaki from Nisekoi, a reference to the meme "your waifu is trash".

The word waifu is a loanword that derives from the English word wife as rendered in Japanese phonology. The earliest use of waifu has been traced back to the 2002 anime Azumanga Daioh, where the teacher Mr. Kimura referred to his wife using a phrase that Western anime viewers interpreted as my waifu. The male counterpart term, husbando (a fictional male character toward whom fans feel romantic or sexual attraction), emerged years later. The term follows the same linguistic pattern as waifu, deriving from the English word husband adapted through Japanese phonology.

The concept gained mainstream attention in 2009 when a Japanese man held a wedding ceremony to marry his waifu, with the ceremony broadcast live to thousands of viewers. Within anime and manga fan communities, waifus encompass any fictional female character that appeals to fans, often selected based on physical appearance, personality traits, or compelling character development.

== Other fandoms ==
Though the term waifu originated in anime and manga communities, the concept has spread to other fandoms and types of media. Fans of video games, Western animation, live-action television shows, and films have adopted the terminology to describe fictional female characters they find romantically appealing. The term can apply to characters from any medium, including 2D animated characters, 3D computer-generated characters, science fiction characters, and even real people portrayed in fictional contexts. Video game characters, in particular, are common subjects for waifu relationships, with dating simulation games specifically designed around forming romantic connections with fictional characters.

The term also applies to non-human fictional characters. The My Little Pony: Friendship Is Magic fandom has adopted waifu terminology to describe romantic and sexual attraction to the show's pony characters. In various parts of the brony fandom, particularly on /mlp/ (the My Little Pony board on 4chan), fans commonly refer to their preferred pony characters as waifus and frequently engage in discussions about romantic feelings toward them.

== Analysis ==
The waifu phenomenon is a form of parasocial relationship where individuals develop genuine emotional attachments to fictional characters. In 2025, approximately 38% of anime fans reported having a waifu or husbando, with "decisions about fictional partners matching expectations based on evolutionary mate selection." Modern technology has expanded these relationships through artificial intelligence chatbots that allow fans to interact with digital representations of their chosen characters. Having a waifu is seen as a possible solution for those who have experienced trauma during a relationship.

A 2025 study published in the journal Psychology of Popular Media indicated that sexual connections with fictional characters correlate strongly with physical appearance, while emotional connections develop based on both personality traits and perceived similarity between the fan and character. The study also identified gender differences in these relationships: men tend to form sexual connections with characters, while women more often develop emotional bonds.

A small qualitative study of Indonesian university students found that some waifu/husbando enthusiasts perceive stigma, largely overlapping with broader prejudice against anime fans.

== See also ==
- Avatar (computing) – Graphical representation of a user or a user's alter ego or character
- Fictosexuality – Attraction to fictional characters
- Nijikon – Attraction to two-dimensional characters
- Otaku – Someone highly interested in anime and manga
