= Demisexuality =

Only experiencing secondary sexual attraction

- Etymology: Latin: demi, meaning "half"
- Classification: Sexual identity
- Parent category: Asexual spectrum

Other terms
- Associated terms: Gray asexuality; Demiromanticism; Asexuality

Flag
- Demisexual pride flag
- Flag name: Demisexual pride flag
- Meaning: Black triangle represents asexuality, gray represents gray asexuality, white represents sexuality, and purple represents community.

Demisexuality is a term used to describe individuals who rarely or never experience sexual attraction solely based on immediately observable characteristics such as appearance, personality, voice, or smell, and do not typically experience attraction immediately after a first encounter. A demisexual person generally tends to develop sexual attraction only after an emotional bond has formed. The amount of time that a demisexual individual needs to know another person before developing sexual attraction towards them varies from person to person. Demisexuality is generally categorized on the asexuality spectrum.

== History ==
The term was coined in the Asexual Visibility and Education Network Forums in February 2006. Based on the theory that allosexuals experience both primary and secondary sexual attraction and asexuals do not experience either, the term demisexual was proposed for people who experience the latter without the former. However, David Jay suggested a similar word in 2003, called semisexual.

Demisexuality, as a component of the asexuality spectrum, is included in queer activist communities such as GLAAD and The Trevor Project. Demisexuality also has finer divisions within itself.

The word gained entry to the Oxford English Dictionary in March 2022, with its earliest use recorded in 2006 as a noun.

Since 2019, the app Tinder includes demisexual as an option for self-descriptors of sexual orientation on profiles.

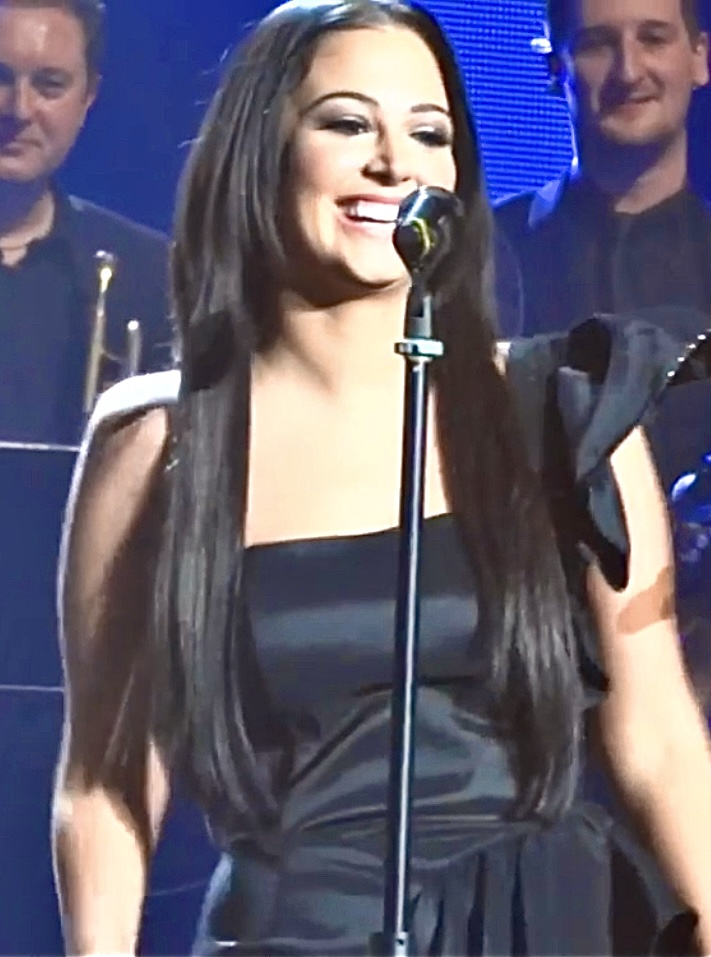
Demisexual singer, Tulisa

In 2024, British singer Tulisa came out as demisexual.

== Definition ==
Demisexuality is used to describe individuals who feel sexually attracted to someone only after developing a close or strong emotional bond with them. Some demisexuals will also feel romantic attraction, while others do not. The duration of time and the degree of interpersonal knowledge and bonding required for a demisexual person to develop sexual attraction may be highly variable between individuals. There is a lack of clear definitions for what qualifies as a close or strong bond in this context, which can cause confusion.

Unlike other words used to describe sexual orientations, the term "demisexuality" does not indicate which gender or genders a person finds attractive.

== Primary and secondary sexual attraction model ==
- Primary sexual attraction: sexual attraction towards people based on instantly available information (such as their appearance or smell). Primary sexual attraction is characterized as being experienced at first sight.
- Secondary sexual attraction: sexual attraction towards people based on information that is not instantly available (such as personality, life experiences, talents, etc.); how much a person needs to know about the other and for how long they need to know about them before secondary sexual attraction develops varies from person to person.

After secondary sexual attraction is developed, demisexuals are not only aroused by personality traits. They also may or may not experience arousal or desire based on the physical traits of the persons with whom they have already experienced secondary sexual attraction towards.

== Common misconceptions and sexual activities ==
A misconception is that demisexual individuals cannot engage in casual sex. Demisexuality refers to how an individual experiences sexual attraction; it does not describe a choice or an action, but describes a feeling instead. While it is common for demisexuals to not desire sex without feeling sexually attracted to the other person, this is not required to be considered demisexual. Many demisexuals may choose to engage in casual sex even without experiencing sexual attraction towards their sexual partner.

== Attitudes towards sex ==
Some demisexual, gray-asexual and asexual individuals, all often included under the "ace umbrella" or "ace spectrum" (that is, presumably related experiences of sexuality contrasted with Allosexuality), use the terms favorable, neutral or indifferent, averse, or repulsed to describe how they feel about sex. Nonetheless, these terms can be used by anyone, regardless of whether they are on the asexual spectrum or not.

- Sex-repulsed: feeling repulsed or uncomfortable towards the thought of engaging in sex. It should not be confused with apothisexuality, because sex-repulsed demisexual people are not absent from feeling attracted to specific individuals, when the attraction urges appear.
- Sex-indifferent: no particular positive or negative feelings towards sex. Sex-indifferent individuals might partake in sex or avoid it.
- Sex-favourable: sex-favourable individuals enjoy sex and may seek it out.
- Sex-ambivalent: experiencing mixed or complicated feelings regarding the act or concept of sexual interaction, usually fluctuating between sex-neutral, sex-favorable, sex-repulsed, sex-negative, or sex-averse.

These terms are generally used to refer to someone's opinion about engaging in sexual activities themself. However, they might also be used to describe how they feel reading, watching, hearing about, or imagining these activities. The term -repulsed in particular is often used to refer to one's feelings about engaging in sexual activities or being around them. One's feelings can vary depending on the situation or other factors such as identity, societal context, common social understanding or intent of actions or comfort level with another individual. For example, someone who is aegosexual may enjoy thinking about sexual activities involving others but may feel repulsed upon the thought of personally participating in such activities.

== In fiction ==
Demisexuality is a common theme (or trope) in romantic novels that has been termed "compulsory demisexuality". In this genre, the paradigm or trope of sex being only truly pleasurable and fulfilling when the partners are in love is a trait most commonly associated with female characters. The added requirements for a connection to occur may engender or reinforce feelings that the connection is unique or special.

== See also ==
- Greysexuality
- Demigender
- Pansexuality
- Sexual fluidity
- Sociosexuality
- Unlabeled sexuality
