= Gray asexuality =

A-Spec sexuality with low levels of sexual attraction that fluctuates over time

- Classification: Sexual identity

Other terms
- Associated terms: Demisexuality

Flag
- Graysexual pride flag
- Flag name: Graysexual pride flag

Gray asexuality, gray-sexuality or graysexuality (also spelled grey) is a sexuality within the asexual spectrum. It is often defined as limited amounts of sexual attraction that can vary in intensity. Individuals who identify with gray asexuality are referred to as being gray-A or gray ace, and are within what is referred to as the "asexual umbrella". Within the asexual spectrum are terms such as demisexual, graysexual, asexual, and many other types of non-allosexual identities.

The emergence of online communities, such as the Asexual Visibility and Education Network (AVEN), has given graysexual people locations to discuss their orientation.

== Definitions ==
=== General ===
Gray asexuality is considered the gray area between asexuality and allosexuality, in which a person may experience sexual attraction in a variety of "unconventional" ways.

The term gray-A covers a range of identities under the asexuality umbrella, or on the asexual spectrum, including demisexuality. Other terms within this spectrum include semisexual, asexual-ish and sexual-ish. The gray-A spectrum includes individuals who very rarely experience sexual attraction, experience it at a low intensity, or feel it only under specific circumstances. The definition of gray-asexuality is intentionally vague, allowing for a variety of experiences that do not fit completely under the allosexual or asexual identities. Sari Locker, a sexuality educator at Teachers College of Columbia University, argued during a Mic interview that gray-asexuals "feel they are within the gray area between asexuality and more typical sexual interest". A gray-A-identifying individual may have any romantic orientation, because sexual and romantic identities are not necessarily linked.

A gray-asexual may engage in sex with someone they have a strong connection to, but their relationship is not based on sex, nor do they crave sex. This can also be known as gray areas, which can be combined with different orientations, such as:

Simplified A-spec diagram

- A graysexual alloromantic person: rarely sexually attracted to others.
- An asexual grayromantic person: not sexually attracted to anyone, but does experience being romantically attracted to others on rare occasions.
- A gray-pansexual aromantic person: rarely attracted to people sexually of all genders, but never romantically attracted to anyone.
- A gynesexual gray-biromantic person: usually sexually attracted to women or feminine-presenting people; rarely experiences romantic attraction towards more than one gender.

Aspec is a term which can be used to mean that one is on the asexual spectrum or aromantic spectrum.

=== Demisexuality ===
The term demisexuality was coined in 2006 by Asexual Visibility and Education Network (AVEN). The prefix demi- derives from the Vulgar Latin *dimedius, which comes from Latin dimidius, meaning "divided into two equal parts, halved."

A demisexual person does not experience sexual attraction until they have formed a strong emotional connection with a prospective partner. The definition of "emotional bond" varies from person to person in as much as the elements of the split attraction model can vary. Demisexuals can have any romantic orientation. People in the asexual spectrum communities often switch labels throughout their lives, and fluidity in orientation and identity is a common attitude.

Demisexuality, as a component of the asexuality spectrum, is included in queer activist communities such as GLAAD and The Trevor Project, and itself has finer divisions.

Demisexuality is a common theme (or trope) in romantic novels that has been termed 'compulsory demisexuality'. Within fictional prose, the paradigm of sex being only truly pleasurable when the partners are in love is a trait stereotypically more commonly associated with female characters. The intimacy of the connection also allows for an exclusivity to take place.

Post-doctorate research on the subject has been done since at least 2013, and podcasts and social media have also raised public awareness of the sexual orientation. Some public figures, such as Michaela Kennedy-Cuomo, who have come out as demisexual have also raised awareness, though they typically face some degree of ridicule for their sexuality. The word gained entry to the Oxford English Dictionary in March 2022, with its earliest usage (as a noun) dating to 2006.

=== Fictosexuality ===
Fictosexuality refers to the sexual attraction towards fictional characters, encompassing those who lack attraction to real individuals and fall within the spectrum of gray asexuality. These individuals can be found within online asexual communities. In recent times, certain fictosexuals have actively participated in queer activism.

=== Fraysexuality ===
Fraysexuality (also less commonly known as ignotasexual) is the type of gray asexuality where people almost only are sexually attracted to people they don't know or people who they are not attached to. Attraction can disappear if an emotional connection develops. In a way, fraysexuality is conditioned almost exclusively to unknown people, even feeling immediate attraction to them. It is often described as the polar opposite of demisexuality.

The attribution of the term fray as sexuality is credited to Tumblr user edensmachine, an account that has been deactivated, and has existed since at least 2014.

=== Aegosexuality ===
The aegosexual pride flag

Aegosexuality is a sub-identity of the asexual spectrum that describes individuals who may experience sexual arousal, enjoy sexual content, masturbation, or sexual fantasies, but do not desire sexual activity with another person or wish to form sexual relationships with others. Originally, the term autochorissexualism, coined in 2012 by sexologist Anthony Bogaert, was used to describe this asexual experience. However, Bogaert viewed autochorissexualism as a type of paraphilia, leading to the term aegosexual being coined by a Tumblr user in 2014 who disagreed with this characterization. The new term is typically preferred within the community.

Some aegosexual individuals feel that their engagement in sexual fantasies makes them "not asexual enough," while others experience sexual fantasies as disconnected from their self-identity, resulting in little to no conflict with their asexual identity. They may also identify as fictosexual to emphasize their preference for fictional objects of attraction.

== Community ==
Pride flags associated with gray asexuality
The graysexual pride flag, in which the gradations of gray represent intermediate sexuality

The demisexual flag, in which the black triangle represents asexuality, gray represents gray asexuality and demisexuality, white represents sexuality, and purple represents community.

Online communities, such as the Asexual Visibility and Education Network (AVEN), as well as blogging websites such as Tumblr, have provided ways for gray-As to find acceptance in their communities. While gray-As are noted to have variety in the experiences of sexual attraction, individuals in the community share their identification within the spectrum.

In society, there is a lack of understanding of who asexuals are. They often limit their interactions to an online platform. Asexuals have also found it safer to communicate through the use of symbols and slang. Asexuals are often referred to as aces. People are often under the misconception that asexuals hate sex or never have sex. For them, sex is not a focal point. This is where the term gray-asexual comes in.

A black, gray, white, and purple flag is commonly used to display pride in the asexual community. The gray bar represents the area of gray sexuality within the community, and the flag is also used by those who identify as gray-asexual:

- The black stripe represents asexuality as a whole.
- The gray stripe is for asexuals who fall anywhere within the asexual spectrum, including gray-asexual and demi-sexual identities.
- The white stripe represents allies of asexuality, including the non-asexual partners of some asexual people.
- The purple represents the asexual community.

== Research ==
A 2019 survey by The Ace Community Survey reported that 10.9% asexuals identified as gray-sexual and 9% identified as demisexual, though asexuality in general is relatively new to academic research and public discourse.
