= Association for Freedom of Entertainment Expression =

Japanese anti-censorship organization

- エンターテイメント表現の自由の会
- Formation: August 8, 2013; 13 years ago
- Location: Japan
- President: Takatoshi Sakai
- Director: Akihiko Kondo
- Key people: Taro Yamada
- Website: afee.jp/english/

Association for Freedom of Entertainment Expression (AFEE, Japanese: エンターテイメント表現の自由の会, romanized: Entāteimento hyōgen no jiyū no kai) is a non-partisan political organization founded in Japan in 2013 that works to defend freedom of expression in entertainment media such as anime, manga, and video games.

== Advocacy ==
AFEE argues that child pornography laws should focus on protecting real child victims, and not ban manga and anime, which do not have real victims of abuse.

AFEE is opposed to censorship, and in 2025 issued a statement opposing financial censorship on Steam and itch.io caused by Collective Shout. Representative Takatoshi Sakai said that in recent years, characters have increasingly been criticized as sexual objects, and that something that has already been made public should not be retracted due to criticism from outside.

== Leadership ==
Taro Yamada, a member of the House of Councillors, serves as the organization's honorary advisor, and the organization's representative, Takatoshi Sakai, was Yamada's secretary. The director is Akihiko Kondo, known for unofficially marrying Hatsune Miku in 2018 and the founder of the General Incorporated Association of Fictosexuality.
