= .moe =

Internet top-level domain

- Introduced: 2013
- TLD type: Generic top-level domain
- Status: Active
- Registry: Interlink
- Sponsor: None
- Intended use: The marketing of products or services deemed moe
- Registration restrictions: None
- Documents: ICANN registry agreement
- DNSSEC: yes
- Registry website: nic.moe/en/

.moe is a generic top-level domain (gTLD) in the Domain Name System of the Internet. Its name comes from the Japanese slang word moe, indicating its intended purpose in the marketing of products or services deemed moe.

== History ==
Interlink began developing the moe top-level domain (TLD) in 2012. On November 13, 2013, ICANN and Interlink entered into a registry agreement under which Interlink operates the moe TLD. Interlink sponsored a contest held between April 11 and May 6, 2014, to design the domain's logo. The general registration period began on July 22, 2014.

== Accredited registrars ==
As of March 2024.

- 1&1 Internet SG
- 1API GMBH (Hexonet)
- 101 Domain, Inc.
- Ascio Technologies Inc.
- BR Domain, Inc. d.b.a. namegear.co.
- Nom-IQ Limited
- CSC Corporate Domains, Inc.
- COREhub S.R.L.
- Dynadot LLC
- Domaininfo AB
- Encirca
- EuroDNS S.A.
- Gabia Inc.
- Gandi
- Gonbei Domain
- GoDaddy
- Host Europe Group
- Instra Corporation
- InterNetWorx
- Key-Systems LLC
- Lexsynergy
- Marcaria.com International
- MarkMonitor Inc.
- Nominate
- Name.com
- Namecheap
- Net-Chinese Co., Ltd.
- NetNames
- Network Solutions, LLC
- Openprovider (Hosting Concepts)
- OVH
- Porkbun
- Register.com
- SafeBrands SAS
- Safenames
- Tucows (Hover)
- Whois Networks Co., Ltd. (Yesnic)
