= Moetan =

Series of English-language study aids for Japanese-speakers

- Cover of the first study book

もえたん
- Genre: Magical girl, Edutainment
- Anime television series
- Directed by: Keiichiro Kawaguchi
- Written by: Saki Hasemi
- Music by: Takeshi Watanabe
- Studio: Actas
- Original network: Chiba TV, TV Kanagawa, TV Osaka, TV Saitama, TV Aichi
- Original run: 8 July 2007 – 23 September 2007
- Episodes: 13

Moetan (もえたん) is a series of English language study aids published by SansaiBooks in Japan. Targeted at otaku, it attempted to teach English words using examples drawn from computer games and anime.

In the reprint of the first Moetan book and the bath towel sold during Comic Market 69, "MOETAN" stands for 'Methodology Of English, The Academic Necessity'. The acronym may have been chosen as a play on combining the words moé and -tan, both terms of cuteness used in relation to girl characters in anime, to create a portmanteauic double meaning.

== Moeru Eitango Moetan ==
Moeru Eitango Moetan (萌える英単語 もえたん), also known as The Moetan Wordbook, is the first in the Moetan series, published in 2003.

Each chapter consists of a short story, written in pure Japanese, concerning the adventures of "Nao-kun" (a high school student) and "Ink-chan" (a mysterious magical girl who arrives to help him with his studying), followed by a set of word examples.

In 2005–3–25, the book was revised with improved grammar, and retitled 'MOETAN Methodology Of English, The Academic Necessity' (もえたん Methodology Of English, The Academic Necessity). This version was published in Korean and Traditional Chinese (Taiwan, Hong Kong).

The Chinese version was published by Min-Hsien Cultural Enterprise Co., Ltd.

=== Characters ===
- Ink Nijihara (虹原 いんく, Nijihara Inku) - Heroine of Moetan. She lives next door to Nao and is infatuated with him.
- Pastel Ink (ぱすてるインク, Pasuteru Inku) - The transformed version of Ink Nijihara, differentiated by the blue hair and duck costume.
- Nao-kun (ナオくん) - A well liked but lazy high school student.
- Ah-kun (あーくん) - A magician in the magical kingdom, usually in the form of a duck.
- Pen-kun (ペンくん) - A magician in the form of a pencil.
- Oni-kun (おにくん) - A magician in the form of an eraser.
- Ka-kun (かーくん) - A magician in the magical kingdom, usually in the form of a cat.

=== Voice cast (CD version) ===
- Ink Nijihara: Yukari Tamura
- Nao-kun: Yuji Ueda
- Ah-kun: Masaya Onosaka

== Moetan II ==
The sequel of Moeru Eitango Moetan was published in two volumes. It includes 1601 words.

Moetan II is available in Chinese (Taiwan, Hong Kong) and Korean (South Korea).

This book is targeted towards serious, tutorial readers.

=== Characters ===
- Tōya (透也) - Moetan II's protagonist.
- Yuni (優仁) - Moetan II's heroine.
- Chitose (千歳) - Touya and Yuni's classmate.

== Moetan subreader ==
AKA -> (もえたん サブリーダー 〜文法·表現編〜)

Based on previous two books in the Moetan series, it teaches English grammar.

This book is targeted towards casual, tutorial readers.

== Moetan 3 ==
AKA -> (もえたん3 魔法少女の帰還〜Return of the Little Witch〜)

This version added poetry and Japanese culture. The book included two stories: Bill and Sam's Excellent Adventure and Return of the Little Witch. Return of the Little Witch was illustrated by POP.

This book is targeted towards casual, entertainment readers.

Chinese version was published on September 9, 2006, by Min-Hsien Cultural Enterprise Co., Ltd.

This book features characters from first Moetan book.

== Moetan Online ==
This is a series of phone applications published by Marvelous Liveware. They are available to i-mode, EZWeb, and SoftBank Mobile users.

== Moetan Listening CD ==
Vol.1

Published in Comic Market 69.

Vol.2

Published in Comic Market 70.

== Anime ==
Bandai Visual, Hakuhodo DY Media Partners Incorporated and Planet Entertainment produced a television series based on the book. Anime studio Actas was responsible for the animation services of the show. The TV series premiered on Chiba Television on July 8, 2007, followed by TV Kanagawa, TV Osaka, TV Saitama, and TV Aichi.

=== Anime characters ===
Ink Nijihara (虹原 いんく, Nijihara Inku)
Voiced by: Yukari Tamura
The protagonist of Moetan. She lives next door to Nao and is infatuated with him. Even though she is 17 she is often mistaken as a grade-schooler, however she makes up for it with her high grades, especially in English. She meets Arc-kun who gives her the power to transform into the magical hero Pastel Ink; using a pink flip phone, her "magical girl transformation" uses ribbons to censor the "naughty bits". She transforms into a duck-like outfit with blue hair. Using this new power she helps the people of her city while also using it to tutor Nao in English. In episode 12 she has lost her magical abilities but still continues to tutor Nao under her own design of Pastel Ink and gets into the same college as he; she has not yet revealed to him that she is Pastel Ink. Ink's quirks are that she is very clumsy, often tripping over nothing, a trait she seems to have gotten from her mother; and becoming entranced to the point of drooling at the thought of being alone with Nao-kun.

Naoto "Nao" Tezuka (ナオくん, Nao-kun)
Voiced by: Yuji Ueda
Nao is a well liked but lazy high school student. He is completely oblivious to Ink's and Sumi's feelings for him and in the earlier episodes doesn't even notice them. He has problems with studying English which causes Ink to use her magical form to tutor him at night. He starts to grow closer to Ink but it is not known if he has deeper feelings for her than friendship (though they are seen holding hands at the end of episode 12 & he said he was interested in her in episode 3) and he is unaware that she is Pastel Ink. He likes to play video games, which he sometimes does instead of doing his homework. It was revealed that when Ink went back into the past it was she who got him addicted to video games.

Arc-kun (あーくん, Ā-kun)
Voiced by: Masaya Onosaka
A magician in the magical kingdom, usually in the form of a duck. He is a hopeless pervert with a lolicon fetish and often drools a waterfall when watching Ink change into Pastel Ink; his viewpoint isn't blocked by ribbons. It was revealed that he was framed by Alice as a peeping tom which got him banished to earth in the first place, this being because he couldn't fall in love with her as her breasts were too big. Arc usually acts as the comic relief. His real form is that of a young handsome man with waist long blond hair.

Sumi Kuroi (黒威 すみ, Kuroi Sumi)
Voiced by: Haruka Tomatsu
Sumi is also in love with Nao and becomes Ink's rival. She is 17 years old even though she looks like a grade-schooler. She is very rich and has a spoiled attitude because of that. Sumi also has a notable love of cats, to the point where she has practically everything in her room in a cat image, even her own nightgown is a large cat suit (with a scrotum). She and Ink were friends when they were younger but for unknown reasons they broke apart (probably because of jealousy since she is horrible at English), even though Ink still tries to be Sumi's friend. A few quirks of hers are that the end of the long strand of hair coming from the front of her head usually portrays what ever she is feeling (!,#, gloved finger pointing); and that she usually falls asleep while studying, which results in her getting hit in the head with a slipper by her maid Ruriko. By the end of the series it seems that her crush for Nao has all but faded and she has started to develop feelings for her magical partner Ka-kun (he has feelings for her as well) and has become good friends with Ink once again. Sumi changes into her magical form Tempera Sumi using a red flip phone, through the use of stars, putting her in a cat style outfit with her hair turned red.

Ka-kun (かーくん, Kā-kun)
Voiced by: Nobuyuki Hiyama
A magician in the magical kingdom, usually in the form of a cat. He is Sumi's partner. Even though he also has a lolicon fetish it is nowhere as severe as Arc's. He usually gets a nose bleed when Sumi changes. He originally blames Arc for his banishment, getting into many petty arguments with him, until it is revealed that it was all set up by Alice. At the end of the series he seems to have fallen in love with Sumi and his true form is that of a handsome man with short, spiky black hair.

Alice Shiratori (白鳥 ありす, Shiratori Arisu)
Voiced by: Kaori Nazuka
By day, she's a famous singing idol. By night, she's a magical girl just like Ink. Her partner is a rabbit who is seen shaking all the time. She transforms into a magical girl using a blue flip phone, changing through use of green glowing feathers, to hunt down Arc-kun for "sins" he has committed. She won't forgive Arc-kun and plans to destroy him, but now that Ink is protecting him, things might be difficult for her. It is revealed that Eternal Darkness, the true antagonist of the show, was sealed in her heart until it was broken when Arc cast her aside; having Arc and Ka-kun framed and banished so it would be easier to take over the Magical Kingdom. Alice was saved through the combined efforts of Sumi and Ink and her true form was revealed to be that of a beautiful woman with long green hair and an ample bust. Even though she dislikes Arc's perverted nature she is still in love with him.

Na-kun (なーくん, Nā-kun)
Voiced by: Tomoko Kaneda
Alice's partner in the form of a stuffed rabbit, who wears a red top hat and constantly shakes. It is revealed in episode 10 that Na-kun is a young girl with the same body structure as Sumi and Ink, whom Arc drools over till being hit by Alice.

Ruriko (瑠璃子)
Voiced by: Rika Morinaga
Sumi's maid. A lovely young woman who always bears a calm smile, yet she is very strict when it comes to Sumi's studies, often hitting her upside the head with a slipper to wake her up. She has a keen eye, not being fooled when Sumi changes into her magical form. Yet even though she is hard on Sumi and not afraid to point out her master's faults, she acts like an older sister. She is very friendly to Ink and refers to Sumi as Ojousama.

Mio Tezuka (手塚 澪, Tezuka Mio)
Voiced by: Eri Nakao
Nao's younger sister. She appears to have some kind of ability to predict the near future. She is an energetic girl and even though she pretends to be fooled, she can tell that Pastel Ink is Ink. Mio also likes the idea of Ink and her brother as a couple and secretly tries to set them up on dates. In episode 12 it is revealed she too is a Magical Girl named Magical Mio with Da-kun as her partner; She transforms using an orange flip phone and changing with hearts, her hair turning blond and wearing a pink dog-like suit. Her powers are uncertain since Da-kun defeated the enemy himself. Mio is more brutal to her partner's perverted actions than the other magical girls.

Remi Suzuki (鈴木 麗美, Suzuki Remi)
Ink's classmate. She takes the stereotypical role in a magical girl series as the beautiful girlfriend to Ink. She has long hair and an ample bust. She adores Ink's little girl appearance and hugs her between her large breasts every time she does something cute.

Rina Tanaka (田中 里奈, Tanaka Rina)
Ink's classmate. She takes the stereotypical role in a magic girl series as the tomboy to Ink. She is the more level headed of the group and enjoys sports.

Rihoko Furuta (古田 りほこ, Furuta Rihoko)
Ink's teacher.

Ink's mother (いんくママ, Inku Mama)
Ink's mother. A very positive-minded young woman that is only a foot taller than her daughter. She is very clumsy, like her daughter.

Da-kun (だーくん, Dā-kun)
Voiced by: Jouji Nakata
A man wearing a brown trench coat and hat who is seen running from the same police officer in almost every episode (almost like a Zenegata/Lupin relationship). It is never explained why the cop chases Da-kun as he is never seen doing anything wrong, and he even helps out Ink every now and again. This has been happening for some time, as in a time travel he was being chased by the same officer, and the officer was seen crying when it appeared that he was unable to arrest Da-kun. It is later revealed that he is the King of the Magical Kingdom, and Mio's partner. He turns into the form of a small dog while still wearing his hat, and has a lolicon fetish as well (drooling and having a nose bleed when Mio changes, a combination of Arc and Kaksu's reaction).

Majimero (マジメロ)
The transformation item used by Ink, Sumi, Mio and Alice in the forms of cell phones.

=== Episodes ===
No.	Title	Original release date
1	"Magical Teacher" "Majikaru Tīchā" (マジカルティーチャー)	July 8, 2007
The story begins as a mage known as Arcs Sheldart Elbayas has been put on trial in front of a council from the planet "Alphabet". He then escapes through a hole he blew in the building. He flees to a field and is found by the king who is then only a voice. He is sent through a black hole and meets up with Ink as she prays at a shrine. She is surprised that a duck is talking because Arcs was turned into it. He then faints and she takes him home. He awakens in her room and introduces himself. He Tells her she has to become a mage and when she accepts he gives her the "Magi-Mail", which to her is just a regular cellphone. She then goes to Nao-kuns house to help him with his English homework. While there, Arcs finds a dirty magazine on the floor and shows it to Pastel Ink. Nao-kun sees this and kicks her out.
2	"I Don't Need a Rival" "Raibaru nante Iranai" (ライバルなんていらない)	July 15, 2007
Two mysterious beings, a girl and a tiger like creature(who later transforms into a small cat), appear on Earth and both have the same mission, to get to Arcs. Then Ink gets a distress call and transforms outside of class. Sumi sees this happen. Then Pastel Ink and Arcs get stuck in Dream And Illusion Space also known as "DAIS", an alternate universe created with magic. The cat is revealed to be Kaksu, who was a colleague of Arcs from the Magical Kingdoms.
3	"Great Scare Tactics" "Kyōfu Daisakusen" (恐怖大作戦)	July 22, 2007
Sumi, Ink, and company go to Sumi's villa to swim and stay the night. At night, a ghost named Mihoto plays pranks on the girls, scaring them by playing with the lights. Sumi and Ink discover each other's status as a magical girl when they run into Ah-kun and Ka-kun in the bath. They discover a treasure room under the mansion where Dandy saves the girls from a falling wall of spikes with a "Rolling Thunder Kick."
4	"The Idol Within Time" "Toki no Naka no Aidoru" (時の中のアイドル)	July 29, 2007
Alice is introduced as an idol. She arranges a visit to see her fans, but never shows up. Sumi and Ink investigate a school where a drunkard is making a ruckus. A giant octopus with panties on its head then attacks the school. Ink and Sumi (who fantasizes of the octopus's potential tentacle attacks) find their magical attacks useless against the creature. Dandy saves Ink once more by throwing a rose at a tentacle. The drunkard from before comes out, has an odd conversation with Ah-kun, and sacrifices himself to destroy the octopus. At night, Alice attacks Ah-kun. Ink appears, but soon after, Alice is forced to retreat anyway.
5	"A Little Memory" "Chiisa na Omoide" (小さな思い出)	August 5, 2007
Alice attacks Ah-kun and Ink again with a giant horse from another time-space continuum. Ah-kun is forced to create a temporal portal to send the giant horse away, but he and Ink get pulled into the same portal by Alice's magical binds. They end up travelling back in time for 10 years. While waiting for Ah-kun to recover his magical energy so that they can return to present, they wander around the neighborhood and run into the 10-year-ago version of Ink's mom, Sumi, and Nao-kun. Little Sumi is scarred for life when Ink tries to teach her English but it's too difficult for her age, while Nao-kun's addiction to video games starts when Ink introduces him to his first video game.
5.5	"Sumi and Ruriko's Moetan Diary" "Sumi to Ruriko no Moetan Daiarī" (すみと瑠璃子のもえたんダイアリー)	August 12, 2007
A recap episode where Sumi and Ruriko introduce the main cast and summarize the events of the season so far.
6	"The First Date" "Hajimete no Dēto" (初めてのデート)	August 19, 2007
Ink goes on a date with Nao-kun, and hilarity ensues.
7	"The Targeted School Festival" "Nerawareta Gakuen-sai" (ねらわれた学園祭)	August 26, 2007
At the school festival, Ink's class is presenting a haunted cafe. Alice uses this chance to test Ah-kun's "true character" by giving him 3 trials. After much ado about nothing, Ah-kun manages to pass all 3 trials with Ink, Sumi, and Ka-kun's help.
8	"Trouble" "Toraburu" (トラブル)	September 2, 2007
The animation staff meet to discuss ways to improve rating, and decide to provide more fanservice for the show. Rina has been acting differently lately such as putting on makeup, and her friends Remi and Ink decide to follow her around to find out why. Finally in a public bathhouse, Rina confesses her reason, and for a minute there it looks as if she has a yuri crush on Remi. But it turns out she was just wearing makeup to cover up an acne.
9	"The Wind...Flows" "Kaze...Nagareru" (風...流れる)	September 9, 2007
Ink catches a cold and has to leave school early. Her friends visit her at home. While taking care of her Sumi remembers their friendship from their childhood.
10	"Forbidden Time" "Kindan no Toki" (禁断の時)	September 16, 2007
A dangerous enemy named Black Darkness has been unleashed, threatening to destroy the world. Ink, Sumi and their sidekicks travel to the magic kingdom to battle her.
11	"Don't Give Up, Examinee!" "Makeru na Jukensei!" (負けるな受験生!)	September 23, 2007
Having completed their mission to save the world, Ink and Sumi return home but they can no longer transform or use magic. Ink becomes depressed because she can't help Nao-kun study English anymore. When Sumi realizes this she devices a plan to help Ink -- by recreating their uniform so that they can cosplay as magical girls.
12	"Skip!" "Sukippu!" (スキップ!)	September 23, 2007
After putting in a lot of hard work into their studies, Ink and her friends all pass the college entrance exams and enter college. Dandy-san, Alice and others from the magical kingdom all enjoy living in the human world now. When a new enemy appears, Nao-kun's little sister Mio-chan becomes a magical girl to fight her.
13	"The Supreme Ruler at the End of the Century! The Magical Girls' Combined Attack" "Seiki Matsu Hasha! Mahō Shōjo Sō Shingeki" (世紀末覇者!魔法少女総進撃)	N/A
Ink is killed by Nao-kun and she ends up in a different world. Mio-chan and her friends must go there to save this world from the diabolical Nao-kun who wants to change all girls into DFC (Delicious-Flat-Chest).

Takayuki Nagatani, a producer of the Moetan moe anime television series, posted on the official series blog that Episode 6 will be replaced by a highlight clips episode in Japan "for various reasons." Episode 6 will be only available on DVD, while Episode 5.5 "Sumi to Ruriko no Moetan Diary" ("Sumi and Ruriko's Moetan Diary") took over its broadcast slot.

=== Adaptations ===
Home page of the TV series hosted 4 square comic strip that are updated daily starting from 2007-07-09. 99 strips had been produced.

Beat Net Radio and Lantis web radio hosted Moetan Listening Radio, featuring Sumi and Ruriko.

Lantis sold Moetan audio drama CD on September 9, 2007.

Lantis sold soundtrack CD for the opening and ending songs of the TV show on July 25, 2007, and August 8, 2007, respectively.

Tetsuya Takahashi produced a comic book titled Moetan Magical Busters, please save the world! (もえたん 〜Magical Busters, please save the world!〜), which was serialized in Moetan monthly magazine (もえたん ぷちげっかん) that is bundled with the August 2007 issue of Gamelabo magazine. The cover for the magazine was illustrated by POP. 4 volumes of the comic are planned. The book followed the design and settings of the TV series.

== Video games ==
On August 9, 2007, Techno Quest Inc. published a vertical shooter, based on the Moetan franchise, for Windows XP titled Moetan Shooting (もえたん·しゅ〜てぃんぐ).

=== Moetan DS ===
MOETAN Do you Study with us?
- Developer: Milestone Inc.
- Publisher: Idea Factory
- Platform: Nintendo DS
- Release: 2008-07-24
- Genre: Vertically scrolling shooters

It is a learning video game using design and cast from the TV series.

Preorder include DVD video.

== Combat picture book ==
Hobby Japan published Nijiiro Ink (from MOETAN) and Alice (from Nitro+ games?) as part of Queen's Gate combat picture book game series, which is based on the Lost Worlds game rules.

== See also ==
- Edutainment
- Moe book
- Moegaku
