= Moe (slang) =

Affection for manga and anime characters

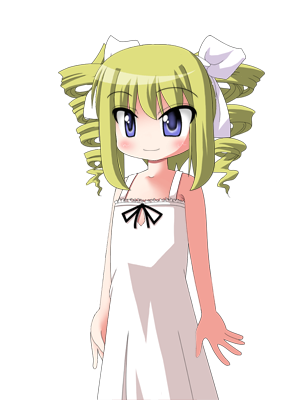
A character that might appear in a manga or anime series that can elicit feelings of moe

Moe (Japanese: 萌え; pronounced [mo.e]), often romanized as moé, is a Japanese word that refers to feelings of strong affection, mainly towards characters in manga, anime, video games, and other media directed at the otaku market. Moe has also gained usage for feelings of affection towards any subject.

Moe is related to neoteny and the feeling of "cuteness" a character can evoke. The word moe originated in the late 1980s and early 1990s in Japan and is of uncertain origin, although there are several theories on how it came into use. In 2004, the term was nominated for the U-Can New Words and Buzzwords Awards, and in 2005, the phrase "Moe~" (萌え〜) won a spot in the top ten, represented by the Akihabara-based maid idol group Kanzen Maid Sengetsu (完全メイド宣言). In 2018, the term was officially added to the seventh edition of the prestigious Japanese dictionary Kōjien, marking its deep integration and recognition within standard Japanese society.

Moe characters have expanded through Japanese media, and the concept has been commercialised. Contests, both online and in the real world, exist for moe-styled things, including one run by one of the Japanese game rating boards. Various notable commentators such as Tamaki Saitō, Hiroki Azuma, and Kazuya Tsurumaki have also given their take on moe and its meaning.

== Meaning ==
Moe used in slang refers to feelings of affection, adoration, devotion, and excitement felt towards characters that appear in manga, anime, video games, and other media (usually Japanese). Characters that elicit feelings of moe are called "moe characters". Included in the meaning of the word is the idea that "deep feelings felt towards a particular subject" is used in cases where a simple "like" is not enough to express the feeling. The common feature in all feelings of moe is that the subject of such feelings is something that one cannot possibly have a real relationship with, like a fictional character, a pop idol, or an inorganic substance. It can be considered a kind of "pseudo-romance", but it is not always seen to be the same as "romance".

=== Linguistic features ===
Linguistically, "moe" originates as the ren'yōkei (noun-like verb stem) of the verb moeru (萌える). In slang, however, it has expanded to function as a noun, an interjection, and a prefix or adjective stem (e.g., in compound terms like moe-chara [moe character] or moe-zoku [moe tribe]).

When used as a verb, moeru conjugates as an Ar-group shimo-ichidan (下一段活用) verb. Although the literal verb meaning "to sprout" is purely intransitive, slang structures that carry transitive-like intent operate through intransitive grammar using the postposition ni (に). For example:

- "A wa B ni moeru" (AはBに萌える, lit. "A feels moe towards B"), where the subject (A) is receptive to the stimulus of the object (B).
- "B wa moeru" (Bは萌える, lit. "B is moe-evoking"), where B functions as the source of the feeling.

In general conversation, both the subject and object are frequently omitted, treating the state of "moeru" as an autonomous emotional phenomenon similar to verbs like naku (泣く, "to cry") and nakeru (泣ける, "evokes tears").

=== Taste assertion ===
According to cultural critic Kaichiro Morikawa, the term moe operates primarily as a "word used to assert one's taste or hobby." For instance, if an individual declares, "Within Heidi, Girl of the Alps, I am Clara-moe" (クララ萌え), they are not merely expressing a localized preference for the character Clara; rather, they are using their adoration for Clara as a template to explicitly outline and explain their broader subcultural tastes, habits, and aesthetic standards to other people.

=== Domestic versus international scope ===
In Japan, the word has evolved to be used regarding all kinds of topics, expanding far beyond its initial scope of fictional two-dimensional beautiful girl (bishōjo) characters. Today, Japanese usage of moe can encompass real actors, pop idols, non-human animals, inanimate physical objects (such as "factory moe" [工場萌え], whale moe, and wok moe), and intangible concepts like specific musical arrangements.

In contrast, in international communities (including English, Spanish, French, and Italian-speaking fandoms), the term "moe" (often capitalized as "MOE") is almost strictly restricted to instances where a person feels affection, adoration, or cuteness towards fictional characters (especially moe characters) and the specific visual and personality tropes associated with them. This localization is demonstrated in international editions of anime, such as The Melancholy of Haruhi Suzumiya, where occurrences of the word "moe" in Japanese dialogue are directly transliterated as "MOE" in subtitles and dubbing to preserve this specific subcultural connotation.

== Origins ==
The term's origin and etymology are unknown. Anime columnist John Oppliger has outlined several popular theories describing how the term would have stemmed from the name of anime heroines, such as Hotaru Tomoe from Sailor Moon (Tomoe is written as 土萌, relevant kanji is the same) or Moe Sagisawa from the 1993 anime Kyōryū Wakusei. The term first became popular in 1993-94 among users of Japanese bulletin board systems.

Historically, early posts on the Japanese network newsgroup fj demonstrate some tentative usage of the word. In 1988, a user wrote, "My youth's hot blood is sprouting/burning up" (青春の熱き血潮が、萌えたぎります), though it remains ambiguous whether this was an early conceptualization of moe or simply a typographical error for "burning" (燃えたぎります). By 1994, posts targeting female voice actors using "moe" emerged, followed by a rapid surge in posts targeting two-dimensional fictional characters in 1995.

=== Kyōryū Wakusei (Dinosaur Planet) theory and dispute ===
The theory attributing the term to the character Moe in the 1993 NHK educational anime Kyōryū Wakusei was popularized by cultural commentator Toshio Okada and remains a widely cited origin story. However, science writer Ryuichi Kaneko, a core staff member and writer for the show, disputed this in his book Shurarezaru Nihon no Kyōryū Bunka (2007), stating that the "moe" concept and slang had already existed prior to the show's release. Furthermore, in his writings, Okada misidentified the character's name as "Moe Sagisawa" (鷺沢萌), whereas she had no surname in the actual series (though her initial concept name was Moe Yuki). On the Mapletown Network PC-VAN bulletin board, the phrase "Moe-chan, moe-moe" (萌ちゃん、燃え燃え) was found in July 1993, but the first actual use of "萌え" on that board was in January 1994 regarding Akazukin Chacha, not Kyōryū Wakusei.

=== Sei Marianne community theory ===
Businessman Shinya Takei proposed that the term originated in his high school PC-VAN community "Sei Marianne" (聖まりあんぬ). A text document titled "Sei Marianne Dictionary" from March 1994 features the term "moe~" (もえ〜) to describe a melancholic adoration for Madoka Ayukawa from the manga and anime Kimagure Orange Road. Another theory associated with this community links the term to the character Moe Takatsu from Yui Ayumi's 1993 manga Taiyō ni Smash!.

=== Other theories ===
Psychologist Tamaki Saitō identifies it as coming from the Japanese word for "budding", moeru (萌える). Ken Kitabayashi of the Nomura Research Institute has defined moe as "being strongly attracted to one's ideals". Kitabayashi has identified the word moe to be a pun with the Japanese godan and ichidan verbs for 'to sprout', moyasu (萌やす)/ moeru (萌える), and their homophone 'to burn' (in the sense of one's heart burning, or burning with passion), moyasu (燃やす)/ moeru (燃える).

Anthropologist Patrick Galbraith cites Morikawa Kaichirō, who argues that the term came from internet message boards such as NIFTY-Serve and Tokyo BBS in the 1990s, from fans discussing bishōjo (beautiful girl) characters. Galbraith argues that moe has its roots in the development of bishōjo characters in Japanese subcultures in the 1970s and 80s. This was exemplified in the lolicon boom of the 1980s, a "fertile ground" for the "budding desire for fictional characters".

Another theory suggests that the term was popularized in the reader submission columns of the magazine Fanroad around 1980 by passionate fans of the anime Space Runaway Ideon.

Comiket organiser Ichikawa Koichi has described Lum from Urusei Yatsura as being both the source of moe and the first tsundere. The character of Clarisse from Hayao Miyazaki's The Castle of Cagliostro (1979) has also been cited as a potential ancestral example, with Lupin acting like an older brother to Clarisse and taunting Count Cagliostro for marrying someone half his age. According to culture critic Hiroki Azuma, as Rei Ayanami from Neon Genesis Evangelion became a more prominent character among fans, she "changed the rules" governing what people regarded as moe-inspiring. The industry has since created many characters which share her traits of pale skin, blue hair and a "quiet personality".

== Usage ==
=== Commercial application ===
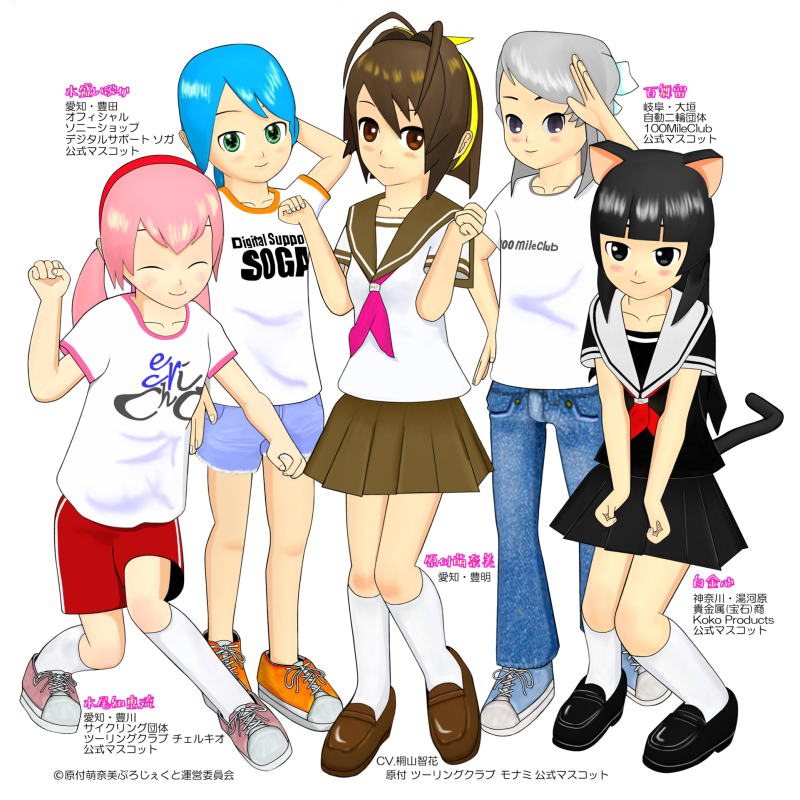
Some commercial moe characters: (left to right) Chieru Kio, Ibuka Kimori, Monami Gentsuki, Mairu Hyaku, Kokoro Shirogane

Moe characters have expanded within the Japanese media market. In 2003, the market for moe media such as printed media, video, and games was worth 88 billion yen; roughly one-third of the estimated 290 billion yen otaku market in Japan. In 2009, Brad Rice, editor-in-chief of Japanator, said that "moe has literally become an economic force" saying that more products use some element of moe in order to sell better. Rice also goes on to say that moe is used to get anime and manga works out to "hardcore fans who buy excessive amounts of items related to the character of their desire."

A 2006 nationwide public survey published by the Computer Entertainment Supplier's Association (CESA) involving 1,103 respondents aged 3 to 79 showed that 66.4% of males and 65.6% of females recognized the term moe (defined as holding affection for manga, anime, and game characters). Active usage of the term ("know it well and use it myself") peaked among males aged 20–24 at 8.9%, and among females aged 15–19 at 12.1%. By 2015, a lifestyle survey of graduating university students by Mynavi reported that approximately 1 in 2.7 (36.4%) identified themselves as "otaku", demonstrating the growth of the demographic associated with moe culture.

Recognizing the economic value of the movement, the Japanese internet service provider Interlink registered the `.moe` top-level domain with ICANN, launching its public registration in 2014.

John Oppliger from AnimeNation traced the first decade of the 2000s as the time when moe became increasingly popular and recognized. Commercialization was a result of interest that followed, and moe evolved from being a non-sexual desire to being a sexually sublimated fascination with cuteness. Oppliger goes on to say that moe shifted entirely from an interchange between character and viewer, to a focused fetish of viewers. Examples used by Oppliger include the series; K-On, Lucky Star, and Moetan where he points out they are "revolved around adorable, whimsical, clumsy, early-adolescent girl characters in order to evoke, enflame, and manipulate the interests and affections of viewers." Rather than evoking moe feelings, they were literally moe characters that had defining characteristics of the moe style. Oppliger referred to these girl characters as "adorably cute, just a bit sexually appealing, and self-conscious but not yet cynical" going on to say that they demand notice and adoration, rather than passively earning it.

With moe anthropomorphism, moe characteristics are applied to give human elements to non-human objects. The Gradius video game series features a spaceship named Vic Viper. For a spin-off game, moe is applied to Vic Viper to create Otomedius.

=== Sexual attraction ===
Sometimes feelings of moe towards fictional characters include "sexual excitement", or are understood in the context where "lots of beautiful girls and boobs appear." In these cases, feelings of pure affection that gradually become stronger over time can lead to these feelings of eroticism.

Queer theorist Yuu Matsuura says that sexual desire oriented to such characters differs from a desire toward humans.

Moe, however, is also considered to be distinct from pure lust (or ero). While small amounts of lust are generally accepted within the boundaries of moe, a feeling focusing too heavily on raw sexual arousal is typically deemed outside its scope. To define this boundary, light novel author Nagaru Tanigawa utilized a character's dialogue in his 2005 book Despair-type: The Closed World to present a litmus test: if an individual still maintains their feelings of affection and love for a character immediately after masturbating to them, it qualifies as moe; if the affection dissipates, it was merely ero (lust).

According to commentator Tōru Honda, who considers moe to be "romance within one's head", the ideal kind of love within moe is "romantic love".

=== Global spread ===
The international spread of moe has been noted in various global media. On 14 March 2007, the Japanese edition of Newsweek featured a maid-garbed anime girl on its cover alongside a major feature titled "The Moeing World" (萌える世界), analyzing the global export of the aesthetic. In January 2017, the Chinese state broadcaster China Central Television (CCTV) utilized the term in a headline describing a giant panda as the "most moe panda" (最萌大熊猫), demonstrating the integration of the terminology into mainstream state-run journalism within the Chinese-speaking world.

=== Contests ===
Several informal contests or rankings for characters considered to be moe exist on the Internet. One such contest is the Anime Saimoe Tournament, organized by members of the textboard 2channel, which ran every year from 2002, until its cancellation after the 2014 contest due to declining interest. Moe characters from the fiscal year starting 1 July and ending 30 June the following year were eligible. Each tournament had at least 280 moe characters. Spin-offs of the Saimoe Tournament include RPG Saimoe, which has video game characters, and SaiGAR, a competition between the "manliest men of anime". In 2006 and 2007, the Saimoe Tournament became an increasingly international event; 2channel users obliged foreign otaku by putting up an English version of their rules page. The International Saimoe League, also known as ISML, is another online moe popularity contest that is for a worldwide audience. The contest started in 2008 and was held annually. Initially, only female characters were eligible, a male exhibition tournament was added in 2011, which would take place after the end of the main tournament. It was made into an official tournament alongside the female characters in 2015.

Moe contests also exist in magazine publications, and in the real world. The Moe Game Awards are given annually to bishōjo games published that year in various categories, such as background music, character design, fandisc, graphics, and erotic content. They were started in 2006 as the Bishōjo Game Awards, but their name was changed to Moe Game Awards in 2009. It is sponsored by the Japanese game rating board Ethics Organization of Computer Software (EOCS) and is described by them as "an R18 game industry version of the Academy Awards". Magazines that have moe contests in them include the Japanese magazine Dengeki Moeoh which runs a column called "Moeoh Rankings" (萌王ランキング) and features the top 10 moe characters of the month, as determined by reader votes.

== Related concepts ==
=== Nae ===
The term nae (萎え, lit. "wilting" or "withering") is used as the antonym of moe on the internet. It describes a state of feeling turned off or losing interest in a character. This can occur when a character's actions or personality become off-putting, when a series makes overly blatant or forced attempts to pander with moe aesthetics, or when poor art quality or execution ruins the appreciation of the character.

=== Buhiru ===
In the early 2010s, the verb buhiru (ブヒる) emerged in online communities to describe the act of fans getting hyper-excited or expressing intense, raw enthusiasm over a fictional female character. The term is derived from buhii (ブヒィ), the Japanese onomatopoeia for a pig's squeal. It originated from the derogatory label moebuta (萌え豚, lit. "moe pig") used to mock obsessive male fans of "moe anime." However, fans co-opted the slang, using buhiru to proudly declare their self-deprecation and submissive adoration of their favorite characters (e.g., "I will gladly be a pig for her"). The expression became widely popularized following the 2011 broadcast of the anime adaptation of IS (Infinite Stratos), which was noted for prioritizing dating-sim service elements and character interactions over its main sci-fi narrative.

== Commentary ==
There are various interpretations of the concept of moe, and the subject has been heavily discussed. In his book Beautiful Fighting Girl, psychologist Tamaki Saitō considers the moe used by otaku to be the embodiment of their particular kind of sexuality. Saitō points out that while otaku creations fulfill an abnormal impression of sexuality, few otaku actually apply this impression to real life. He thus argues that moe is something that sustains the otaku's sexuality within a fictional world, with the fiction itself being their subject of desire and having no need for reality.

On the other hand, critic Hiroki Azuma rejects Saitō's argument as "too complicated." Azuma argues that "to moe" is simply the act of analyzing each of the character's moe characteristics and expanding on those characteristics within the mind, and thus differs from mere feelings of empathy. These characteristics can be physical ones, such as cat ears or a maid costume, or a personality archetype, such as that of the character Rei Ayanami. Azuma sees this process as an otaku's act of satisfying their desires among their limited relations, and considers it to be part of a broader trend of "animalization," or the fulfillment of small desires isolated from the context of a grand narrative. Azuma, therefore, simplifies Saitō's idea of moe into the idea of attaining signals of sexual excitement within an isolated environment, similar to the act of training an animal.

In contrast, Tōru Honda argues against the idea that moe is simply "the act of arousal in response to signals, and thus animalization" and argues that this interpretation does not allow one to recall the essence of moe. Honda considers moe to be the act of remembering ideals among the background signals, an act of necessity that arose as the romance rejected by religion continued to be supported by materialism, and thus interprets it as a mental activity relevant to the contexts of mythology and religion. Furthermore, Honda asserts that this "animalization" phenomenon only arose after the "economic bubble" period of Japan, when people consumed real romance- and sex-like products, and says that since moe is commonly interpreted to be in competition with the act of searching for romance in real life, it is thus the antithesis of male-dominant machoism. Also, while Saitō does not distinguish moe from more violent types of sexual abnormalities and speaks of moe in the context of "sentō bishōjo" (beautiful fighting girl), Honda on the other hand treats moe as the polar opposite of an aggressive kind of sexuality.

Anime director Kazuya Tsurumaki defines moe to be "the act of filling in missing information about characters on one's own." Accepting this view, writer Junji Hotta explains that characters are born from human instinct, which is the exact reason why one can be charmed by them much more than one could by real people. Toshio Okada says that while he himself has not fully understood moe, he defines it as not simply being stirred emotionally by beautiful girls, but also as the meta-viewpoint of seeing oneself falling into such a state.

In The Moe Manifesto, anthropologist Patrick Galbraith defines moe as an affective response to fictional characters or representations of them. The applications of this definition are widespread to political, economic, and cultural discourses. For an example in practice, Matthew Brummer describes how Japan's Self Defense Force utilizes popular culture and the moe that it engenders to shape public perceptions of the military establishment: The Manga Military.

== See also ==
- Amae
- Bishōjo
- Bishōnen
- Burikko
- Chibi (slang)
- Fictosexual
- Figure moe zoku
- Hentai
- Human-oriented sexualism
- Ingénue
- Kawaii
- Lolicon and shotacon
- .moe
- Moe anthropomorphism
- Moe book
- Moe-phobia
- Nijikon
- Parasocial interaction
- Sexy baby voice
