= Zenko Kurishita =

Japanese politician (born 1983)

- 栗下 善行

Member of the Tokyo Metropolitan Assembly
- In office July 23, 2017 – July 22, 2021
- In office July 23, 2009 – July 22, 2013

Personal details
- Born: 9 March 1983 (age 43) Chiyoda, Tokyo, Japan
- Party: Constitutional Democratic
- Children: 1
- Education: University of Tennessee
- Occupation: Oracle Employee
- Website: kurishitazenko.jp

Zenko Kurishita (栗下 善行, Kurishita Zenko; born March 9, 1983) is a Japanese free speech activist and politician. He served two terms as a member of the Tokyo Metropolitan Assembly.

== Political career ==
Kurishita was first elected to the Tokyo Metropolitan Assembly in 2009 at the age of 26. During his term as a member of the Tokyo Metropolitan Assembly, he opposed the Tokyo Metropolitan Ordinance Regarding the Healthy Development of Youths on the grounds of freedom of expression, and engaged in a verbal battle with Tokyo Governor Shintaro Ishihara. In 2012, he founded the Japan Restoration Party affiliated party, Tokyo Restoration Association, together with other LDP and Democratic Party members, and served for a short time there. In 2021, he left the Tomin First no Kai, to which he belonged, and joined the Constitutional Democratic Party.

== Activism ==
In 2023, when it emerged that thousands of anime films had nowhere to go and were at risk of being discarded, Kurishita publicly stated on Twitter that he would work with Tokyo Laboratory to prevent this from happening as much as possible.

Kurishita opposed the Tokyo Metropolitan Government's classification of adult books as "unwholesome books" creating a stigma, and together with George Morikawa led a campaign to change the name to the more neutral "Article 8 books." The campaign was successful and led to the names of adult books being changed in Tokyo.

== Personal life ==
Kurishita is married and has one child. Kurishita was a close ally of Taro Yamada and attended the political section of Comic Market together.
