= Moe book =

Type of instructional book

Moe books (萌え本) are books in genres traditionally perceived as "serious" and/or "educational", such as encyclopedias and instructional books, but with additions of moe-style illustrations for style and accent. In recent times however, types of moe books that do not fit this traditional definition have also appeared.

== Overview ==
Moe books have been published across a wide variety of these formal genres in areas including but not limited to: law, technical manuals, English vocabulary books, and military guides. As the genre is not fully established in the publishing market, it's placement in bookstores has not been standardized. Depending on the store, it could be shelved alongside manga, game-strategy guides, or various sub-culture related books. However, perhaps because many publishers that initially began and popularized moe books specialized in programming and technical manuals, there are many cases of moe books being sold in the book sections of electronic retailers. In addition to traditional educational or technical topics, a new sub-genre of "Healing electronic picture books" has emerged. These books incorporate Moe-style characters, warm color palettes, exaggerated designs, lively sound effects, and small interactive games, all designed to soothe emotional stress and offer psychological comfort to readers, especially modern youth. This expansion of the moe aesthetic into therapeutic contexts reflects a broader cultural movement to blend entertainment, education, and emotional healing within digital media.

== History ==
The oldest known moe book was the Copyright and Legal Guide for Computer Users, published in September 2002 by Mainichi Communications. However, even before its release, the author (Project Time Machine) had given it the nickname "Moeru Law Reading Book" and decided to cover popular controversial topics such as: copyright, the Unauthorized Computer Access law, and the Child Prostitution and Pornography law. This helped it achieve strong sales upon release. His book characters, The Ichii sisters, also appeared in the Moe Moe UNIX! UNIX Network Administration Guide, published in March 2003. This unexpected shift from a computer law book to a technical manual helped to establish the standard and foundation for what would later become "moe books".

In Moeru Eitango Moetan, published in November 2003 by Sansai Books, full visual was added. English words examples are heavily inspired by ACG, resulting in over 200,000 books sold. Later, Shuwa System, Eagle Publishing joined the moe book business. In February 2006, Enterbrain published Moeken, which explicitly targeted fans of moe.

After this, various moe books continued to be released by publishers such as Hakuya Shobo (mainly technical manuals) and Eagle Publishing (mainly practical books and web creation manuals).

Recently, however, new types of moe books have emerged, such as Moeken: Moe Prefectures (published by Enterbrain in February 2006), which introduced new targets for moe affection. New movements also include the launch of magazines like MC☆Axis (published by Icarus Publishing), labeled a "Hyper Bishoujo-style Military Magazine."

Chukei Publishing has also released numerous study aids featuring cover illustrations by famous manga artists and illustrators. In October 2010, they collaborated with the manga Lucky☆Star, producing a study book titled Learn Chemistry (Theory Edition) with Lucky☆Star, using the Lucky☆Star characters not only for the cover but also inside the book. The book became a hot topic and was reprinted immediately after release.

Some moe books published by Eagle Publishing and Media Tech Publishing have been translated into Traditional Chinese and published in Taiwan by Mingxian Cultural Enterprise. In 2008, Mingxian also published their own original moe book, The Cutest Great Chinese Immortal Compendium. This book was later released in Japan by Locus under the title Understanding Chinese Immortals Through Moe Illustrations.

== List of moe books and publishers ==
=== Mainichi Communications Inc. ===
- Copyright and Legal Guide for Computer Users (コンピュータユーザのための著作権&法律ガイド)

=== SansaiBooks Co., Ltd. ===
- Moeru Eitango Moetan
- Moetan II
- Moetan 3

=== Shuwa System Co., Ltd. ===
- <poe-lina/> (ぽえりな)
- Magical Tunnel SoftEther (魔法のトンネル SoftEther)

=== Eagle Publishing ===
- Moemoe series

=== JTB Publishing Inc. ===
- Moerurubu (もえるるぶ東京案内)

=== Core Magazine ===
- Moeru diet Go! Go! Moe diet! (萌えるダイエット Go! Go! moe diet!)

=== Enterbrain ===
- Moe×Diet=Moet (萌えて燃やして「もえっと」!!)
- Moe Uranai (萌え占い)

=== Eichi Publishing Inc. ===
- Love Yoga (ラブ・ヨガ 萌える『ヨガ教則本』!!)

=== Online ebooks ===
- Manga Guide to Lisp (the programming language)

=== PHP Institute ===
- Quantum Theory of Cat Ear Girls: The Latest in Emerging Physics
- Cat ear girl's theory of relativity and superstring theory

== See also ==
- The Manga Guides
- Moe
- Non-fiction comics
- User guide
