= Aegosexuality =

Disconnect of the target of sexual arousal from the self

- Etymology: From Ancient Greek: "a-" (α-) (meaning "without" or "not") with Latin roots "ego" (self) and "sexuality".
- Classification: Sexual identity
- Parent category: Asexual spectrum

Other terms
- Synonyms: Autochorissexuality
- Associated terms: Gray asexuality; Fictosexuality

Flag
- Aegosexual pride flag
- Flag name: Aegosexual pride flag

Aegosexuality is a sub-identity (microlabel) of asexuality characterized by a lack of desire to have sex or form sexual relationships with others while still experiencing arousal from sexual content and sexual fantasies. Regarding romantic attraction, the term aegoromanticism is used.

== Etymology and history ==
To describe this form of asexuality, sexologist Anthony Bogaert coined the term autochorissexualism in 2012, defined as "sex without (choris) one's self/identity (auto)" or "identity-less sexuality", which he classified as a type of paraphilia. This was controversial, and a new term, aegosexual, was proposed in 2014 by a user on Tumblr as an alternative that created distance from what they viewed as the negative connotations associated with Bogaert's original term. Since then, aegosexuality has become the term typically preferred by individuals who identify with this experience. The term autochorissexualism has been largely abandoned by the asexual community due to being viewed as problematic and pathologizing.

== Research ==
Research on aegosexuality highlights the diversity within the asexual spectrum and the varied relationships between sexual fantasy and self-identity. Aegosexual individuals may experience marginalization under frameworks such as amatonormativity and human-oriented sexualism.

According to research by Thom Winter-Gray and Nikki Hayfield, some aegosexual individuals feel that their engagement in sexual fantasies makes them "not asexual enough," while others experience sexual fantasies as disconnected from their self-identity, resulting in little to no conflict with their asexual identity.

Some aegosexual individuals identify as fictosexual to emphasize their preference for fictional objects of attraction. According to a study by Yuu Matsuura, which analyzed fictosexual discourse in Japan, critiques have been raised by aego-fictosexual individuals against the human-oriented sexualism that regards fictional sexual content as secondary compared to human-to-human sexual relationships.

== See also ==
- Amatonormativity
- Fictosexuality
- Gray asexuality
