= Taro Yamada =

Japanese politician

- 山田 太郎
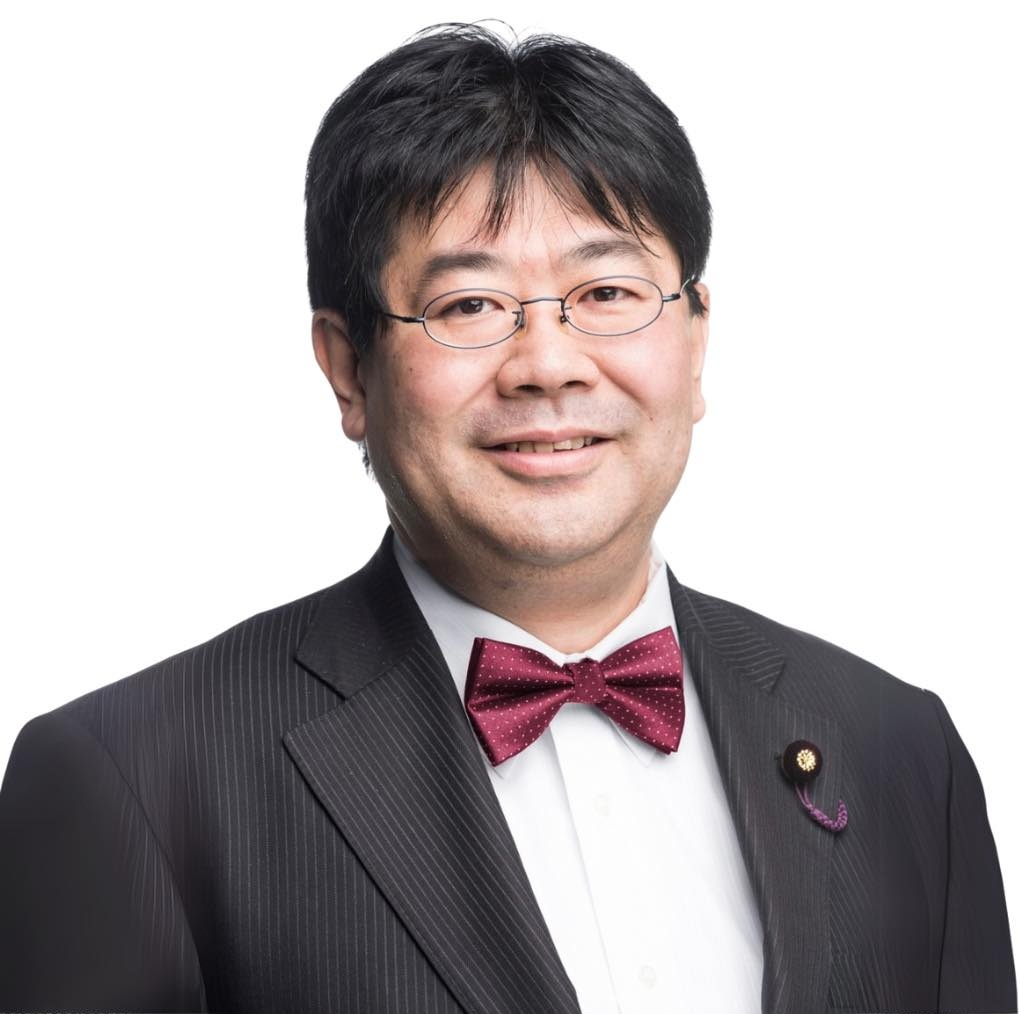
- Official portrait, 2025

Member of the House of Councillors
- Incumbent
- Assumed office July 29, 2019
- In office December 14, 2012 – July 25, 2016

Personal details
- Born: 12 May 1967 (age 59) Ōta, Tokyo, Japan
- Party: Liberal Democratic
- Children: 1
- Education: Keio University
- Occupation: Businessman
- Website: taroyamada.jp

Taro Yamada (山田 太郎, Yamada Tarō; born May 12, 1967) is a Japanese politician and a member of the House of Councillors for the Liberal Democratic Party. He is known as a defender of freedom of expression in manga and anime, and has promoted policies to exempt sexual depictions of fictional characters from legal restrictions. He is an honorary advisor at Association for Freedom of Entertainment Expression.

Taro Yamada was born in Ōta, Tokyo, and began his career as a businessman. After becoming a politician as a member of the Diet for the Your Party in 2012, he lost an election. In 2019 he became a member of the House of Councillors for the Liberal Democratic Party. In the first and second Kishida Cabinets, he served as Parliamentary Vice-Minister for Digital Affairs and Parliamentary Vice-Minister for Education, Culture, Sports, Science and Technology.

During his tenure, he pushed for the inclusion of paragraph 3 in Article 14 of the United Nations Convention against Cybercrime to decriminalize manga and anime, and visited Visa headquarters to end financial censorship.

== See also ==
- Anti-censorship
