= Kazuki Fujitaka =

Japanese philosopher

Kazuki Fujitaka (藤高 和輝, Fujitaka Kazuki; born 1986) is a Japanese philosopher and an associate professor in the Faculty of Cultural Studies at Kyoto Sangyo University. (Note: Fujitaka has stated, "I cannot fully dispel a sense of discomfort with the identity of 'being a man.' ... I oscillate between a male identity and a transgender identity." Consequently, this article uses the pronouns they/them to refer to Fujitaka.) Their areas of expertise include contemporary philosophy, feminism, queer theory, and transgender studies.

== Early life and education ==
Fujitaka was born in Osaka City. They graduated from the School of Human Sciences at Osaka University and completed both their master's and doctoral programs at the same institution. Fujitaka earned a Ph.D. in Human Sciences with a dissertation titled Judith Butler: The Fight for Life and Philosophy.

== Career ==
After serving as a JSPS Research Fellowship for Young Scientists and as an assistant professor at the Graduate School of Human Sciences at Osaka University, Fujitaka joined Kyoto Sangyo University in 2020.

== Research and contributions ==
Fujitaka began their academic career by studying the intellectual formation of Judith Butler’s philosophy. They have since developed a unique concept they refer to as the "philosophy of trouble," which synthesizes insights from feminist and queer thinkers such as Mitsu Tanaka, bell hooks, and Sara Ahmed. Fujitaka is also recognized for their contributions to Japanese scholarship on intersectionality.

In addition to their academic research, Fujitaka is known for their work translating key texts in queer theory into Japanese. Their translation portfolio includes works by Sara Ahmed, Lee Edelman, and Gayle Salamon.

== Books ==
=== Single author ===
- Judith Butler: The Fight for Life and Philosophy (ジュディス・バトラー：生と哲学を賭けた闘い), Ibunsha, 2018, ISBN 978-4-7531-0345-4
- Feminism as a trouble (〈トラブル〉としてのフェミニズム：「とり乱させない抑圧」に抗して), Seidosha, 2022, ISBN 978-4-7917-7443-2
- Not like this: philosophy of transgender and body (ノット・ライク・ディス：トランスジェンダーと身体の哲学), Ibunsha, 2024, ISBN 978-4-7531-0384-3
- The introduction of Butler (バトラー入門), Chikuma shobo, 2024, ISBN 978-4-480-07634-2

=== Translation ===
- Gayle Salamon, Assuming a Body: Transgender and Rhetorics of Materiality, 身体を引き受ける：トランスジェンダーと物質性のレトリック, Ibunsha, 2019, ISBN 978-4-7531-0355-3
