= Nijikon =

Attraction to two-dimensional characters

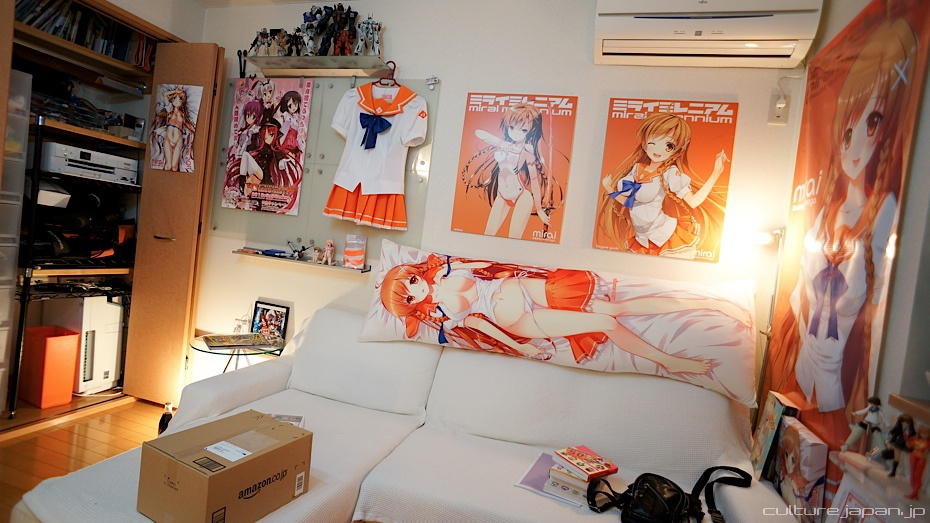
A fan's room decorated with dakimakura and merchandise of the anime character Mirai Suenaga, 2012

Nijikon (二次コン) or nijigen konpurekkusu (二次元コンプレックス), from the English phrase "2D complex", is a sexual or affective attraction towards fictional anime, manga, and light novel characters, as opposed to an attraction towards real human beings. It has been interpreted by some observers as a genuine sexual orientation. This attraction is primarily directed towards the non-realistic characteristics found in manga and anime styles. Initially discussed as male otaku sexuality in Japan, it has more recently been examined within the context of queer studies, extending beyond Japan, and referred to as a form of fictosexuality.

== History ==
The term "nijigen complex" or "nijikon" was used to refer to the partiality towards anime girls within anime and manga fandom during the lolicon boom of the early 1980s, which followed the anime boom of the late 1970s. It began to be used as jargon at that time. Initially, it was also called "2-dimensional lolicon" and "anime lolicon."

However, even before the inception of the "nijigen complex" jargon, works dealing with such complexes existed from before the early modern period, and the concept of "romantic feelings toward a character depicted in an image" itself was based on military stories from the Nanboku-chō period. As found in the historical Japanese epic Taiheiki, we know that such affection already existed in Japan as early as the 14th century at the latest. Imperial Prince Takanaga (second son of Emperor Go-Daigo) fell in love at first sight with a beautiful woman in a painting depicting a scene from The Tale of Genji.

== Otaku sexuality ==
The 2D complex has been characterized by some scholars as "otaku sexuality".

The psychiatrist Saitō Tamaki writes that for otaku, "fiction itself can be a sexual object", with attraction manifesting in an "affinity for fictional contexts." The affection directed at fictitious characters is sometimes termed fictophilia, which is often enhanced by supernormal stimuli.

Sexuality is an integral part of the attraction to 2D characters, as Tamaki points out. One important aspect is the fictionalization of sex: "'Sex' is broken down within the framework of fiction and then put back together again."

Another aspect that plays into otaku sexuality is, according to Tamaki, that otaku generally express strong attraction to the 2D objects of their desire through the use of the term "moe." According to Tamaki this fawning over characters and the expressing of this to other people is a way to put distance between- or objectify their own sexuality. "Saying that one is a moe of a character is a way to comically objectify the self that experiences this attraction."

Tamaki sees this as a form of securing "one's own sexuality in the field of the imaginary and allow it to function."

One such aspect that Tamaki researched is the widespread use of fan creations (fan fiction or fan art) of said characters they feel attracted to in order to take possession of them. "They let the work 'possess' them, weave a different story out of the same materials, and share it with the community. This process is a kind of 'ritual of possession' practiced within the otaku community."

One characteristic that Tamaki points out is that the desire for 2D characters is no substitute for normal heterosexuality. According to his research nijikon and "'healthy' sexuality in daily life" are not mutually exclusive. "...in real life otaku tend to choose perfectly respectable members of the opposite sex as their partners." He addresses that there is a "decisive gap between perverse tendencies in the imagination and 'healthy' sexuality in daily life."

While nijikon has primarily been discussed as a sexuality associated with male otaku, the characteristic of a distinction between imaginary sexual lives and everyday sexual lives is also present among women. There are women who experience attraction toward two-dimensional female characters as "pseudo-females," perceiving them as distinct from real women.

== Research and studies ==
=== Alternative sexual orientation ===
Considering exclusive sexual attraction to manga/anime fictional characters as a "third sexual orientation" is sometimes observed. Elizabeth Miles argues that "as with current theorizations of asexuality, (...) desire for two-dimensional [nijigen] characters forces us to reconsider what sex is and how legal and social proscriptions deny sexual access and the rights of full sexual citizenship."

Queer theorists elucidate alternative sexual orientations through Saitō Tamaki's concept of "multiple orientations." Criticisms have been directed at Saito's Lacanian theory due to its gender binary assumptions and its failure to acknowledge individuals who experience no attraction to flesh-and-blood human. However, according to Keith Vincent, multiple orientations as a capability of "conducting a richly perverse fantasy life while maintaining an utterly "normal" and pedestrian sex life in their day-to-day lives" is consistent with the theories of Eve Sedgwick (Note: Vincent quoted Sedgwick's sentence that "Many people have their richest mental/emotional involvement with sexual acts that they don't do, or even don't want to do.") and Judith Butler. (Note: Vincent quoted Butler's sentence that "the belief that it is parts of the body, the 'literal' penis, the ‘literal vagina, which cause pleasure and desire--is precisely the kind of literalizing fantasy characteristic of the syndrome of melancholic heterosexuality.") Building upon this, Yuu Matsuura applied the concept of multiple orientations to articulate the sexual orientation toward the sui generis entity of two-dimensional characters.

=== Human-oriented sexualism ===
The term used to depict the marginalization of nijikon sexuality is Human-oriented sexualism (対人性愛中心主義 (taijin-seiai-chūshin-shugi)). This term was coined by the fictosexual community in Japan and describes a condition where sexual attraction towards real humans is assumed to be the norm. The concept of human-oriented sexualism can be understood as a combination of the concept of amatonormativity and the idea of compulsory sexuality (Note: Compulsory sexuality is "the social expectation that sexuality is a universal norm, that everyone should be sexual and desire sex, and that to not be sexual or desire sex is inherently wrong and in need of fixing".) from asexual research and the notion of humanonormativity (Note: Humanonormativity is "the belief that people normally and naturally engage in sexual practices and romantic relationships with other human beings. This is not a norm that constructs such sexualities as superior to just engaging in sexual acts with animals (zoophilia).") from objectum sexuality research. Human-oriented sexualism aligns with Judith Butler's concept of "literalizing fantasy" and is linked to heteronormativity and gender binarism. Therefore, critique of human-oriented sexualism is oriented towards solidarity with the feminist and LGBTQ movements.

Qualitative surveys reveal that the practices of nijikon as fictosexual individuals offer certain avenues to challenge both compulsory sexuality and human-oriented sexualism, presenting possibilities for alternative perspectives.

=== Erasure of nijikon sexuality ===
On one hand, nijikon individuals may face disdain due to perceptions that they lack the capacity for "normal" sexual relationships with humans. On the other hand, they may be invalidated and disregarded by the notion that the distinction between two-dimensional characters and three-dimensional (flesh-and-blood) humans is deemed inconsequential.

Based on interview research, nijikon individuals who do not experience attraction towards flesh and blood encounter similar oppression within the framework of compulsory sexuality, comparable to asexual individuals. In a human-oriented sexualist society, there is a lack of hermeneutical resources to effectively articulate the experiences of nijikon, leaving them hermeneutically marginalized.

== Discrimination in legal and ethical controversy ==
Sexually explicit portrayals of two-dimensional child characters are occasionally classified as "child pornography" and have faced legal and ethical condemnation. Likewise, sexual depictions of two-dimensional female characters have been criticized for promoting the objectification of real women.

However, certain researchers and activists contend that the focus should be on challenging human-oriented sexualism, as real pedophilia and the sexual objectification of real women are matters of a culture that desires humans sexually. Their criticism of human-oriented sexualism rebuts the assumption that ACG pornography sexualizes real women and promotes pedophilia, while simultaneously denouncing rape culture. They argue that misrepresenting the desire for two-dimensional characters as a desire for a human is an example of human-oriented sexualist prejudice. For nijikon individuals, the regulation of two-dimensional sexual depictions is not solely a matter of freedom of expression but rather revolves around issues of sexual access and sexual rights.

== Overlap ==
Examples of fetish overlaps is Lolicon.

== See also ==
- Moe (slang)
- Fictosexuality
- Ero guro
- Galge
- Lolicon
- Shotacon
- Superflat
- Waifu
