= Financial censorship =

Type of censorship

Financial censorship is a type of censorship whereby the subject's financial well-being or access to financial services is limited in an attempt to curtail speech. This can be achieved by payment processors and credit card companies blocking payments to those who engage in, sell, or host content, services, or speech that is to be censored.

Even stronger forms of censorship such as financial institutions freezing or closing down accounts are known as debanking. Activists, journalists, and scholars have described the impact as extralegally inhibiting free speech, particularly in online spaces where physical cash is not an option which creates a chilling effect as individuals and platforms self-censor speech in fear of having their finances negatively impacted by such actions.

In the 2020s, many incidents of removal of sexual content from online platforms and marketplaces occurred. These contents removals have been generally attributed to the policies of payment processors and credit card companies regarding what content and services are permitted to be bought and sold using their services. In particular, these policies often restrict or outright forbid the sale of sexual content and services, which has led to numerous closures of accounts of individuals who provide such services, as well as takedowns by various online platforms seeking to comply with their policies.

Financial censorship is highly controversial. Proponents of these takedowns have argued that online adult content promotes sexual objectification, particularly of women, and risks harming children, particularly by way of the minimally regulated nature of these platforms risking the enabling of child sexual exploitation. However, others, including creators of adult content and civil rights groups, have argued that the payment processor's policies have stifled legitimate business in the porn and sex work industries and created a chilling effect on sexual expression online.

== Background ==
Payment processors, particularly payment card companies such as Visa and Mastercard and online money transfer services such as Paypal, have been noted for their policies restricting transactions relating to sexual content and services, which are often classified as "high risk" financial activities.

Visa and Mastercard, in particular, impose restrictions on what type of sexual activity may be depicted in pornography; these restrictions extend to sexual acts or roleplay scenarios deemed objectionable or harmful to their brand image, such as BDSM themes, acts involving bodily fluids such as urination play, or consensual non-consent scenarios. Due to Visa and Mastercard's market dominance in the payment processing business, they are usually described having a duopoly over the adult content industry, and therefore being a de facto regulator of online content considered obscene.

In 2018 FOSTA-SESTA became US law; it intended to hinder sex trafficking conducted via the internet by creating an exemption in Section 230 of the Communications Decency Act, rendering online platforms liable for any content posted by users facilitating online sex trafficking. In a legal analysis in the Brooklyn Journal of Corporate, Financial & Commercial Law, Emily Pollak suggests that the FOSTA-SESTA legislation poses immense legal risks for online platforms and financial institutions, many of whom have banned sexually explicit user-generated content from being published and been reticent to process payments related to sexual services and content in order to avoid becoming the target of legal actions. In a May 2022 article for Reason, Elizabeth Nolan Brown came to a similar conclusion, saying that FOSTA makes it "incredibly risky—reputationally, legally, and financially—for online intermediaries to allow any sort of sexualized business or content."

== Timeline of notable incidents ==
=== Wikileaks (2010) ===
In December 2010, WikiLeaks faced financial censorship after the organization released numerous US government documents including the Afghan War Diary. In response to the leaked documents, PayPal, Mastercard, Visa, Amazon, and PostFinance all suspended service to Wikileaks. PayPal stated this was due to a letter from the State Department to WikiLeaks calling their activities illegal.

=== Pornhub and Onlyfans (2020–2021) ===
In December 2020, journalist Nicholas Kristof published an op-ed in The New York Times, entitled "The Children of Pornhub". In it, Kristof discussed the issue of Pornhub enabling the distribution of child pornography and nonconsensual sex tapes. Near the end of the piece, Kristof argued that payment processors ought to end their associations with the site, saying, "If PayPal can suspend cooperation with Pornhub, so can American Express, Mastercard and Visa." In the days following the publication of Kristof's article, Mastercard and Visa suspended the processing of payments to Pornhub.

In April 2021, payment processor Mastercard announced new policies regarding adult services, which dictated that any adult service business must verify the age and consent of anyone involved. Although the stated goal of the policy was to prevent child exploitation in the production of adult material, and Mastercard denied any deliberate bias against adult creators, the policy was criticized by the American Civil Liberties Union for its "vague and ambiguous" phrasing and the infeasibility of enforcement, especially in the case of online platforms with user-generated content, as well as exacerbating the already high risk and difficulty of doing business in the sex industry.

In August 2021, OnlyFans announced that they would stop allowing sexual explicit content, a change that founder Tim Stokely attributed to the policies of banks which often had refused to process payments to creators earning proceeds from the site. OnlyFans announced a few days later that they would cancel this policy change after public backlash from users.

=== Japanese content merchants (2024) ===
In March 2024, Japanese adult game and doujinshi website DLsite began changing certain content tags relating to adult material, such as changing the word loli (ロリ, Loli) into the more euphemistic hiyoko (ひよこ, Hiyoko; lit. 'chick').

This was in response to requests from Visa and Mastercard contacting them to comply with their policies. However, in April 2024, DLsite owner EISYS announced that the site had suspended credit card payments from Visa, Mastercard, and American Express, leaving users only able to pay using the Japan-based payment card company JCB.

Doujinshi bookstore chains Melonbooks halted payments using Mastercard and Visa on December 19, 2024. Although they did not give an official reason for this decision, Automaton said it was likely that they had received requests to stop selling adult content, noting other Japanese content platforms and services conflicting with international payment processing companies, including the manga archive platform Manga Library Z, which shut down in November 2024 due to similar issues.

The suspensions led various Japan-based platforms supporting adult content, including DLsite, Skeb, and doujinshi retailer Toranoana, to adopt alternative payment methods.

=== Collective Shout gaming controversy (2025) ===
Ahead of its release on Steam in April 2025, the video game No Mercy, described as a "rape simulator", was criticized by government agencies and advocacy groups. After Valve removed it from sale in the UK, Canada, and Australia, the developers voluntarily took the game down.

One of those groups that voiced its opposition to the game was Collective Shout, an Australian non profit that had previously sought action against GTA V and Detroit: Become Human due to their depictions of violence against women. After the game was pulled, Collective Shout reviewed the Steam catalog and found hundreds of games they said were based on rape, incest, and exploitation of women.

According to Melinda Tankard Reist, the founder of Collective Shout, they had tried to reach out to Valve to get these games removed but failed to get a response, and instead turned to payment processors like Visa and Mastercard, asserting that sales of these violated the payment processors' restrictions on allowed content. The campaign was co-signed by other groups and individuals, including those from the US-based National Centre on Sexual Exploitation (NCOSE, formerly "Morality in Media"), Exodus Cry (US), FiLiA (UK), and Coalition Against Trafficking in Women Australia (CATW).

By July 2025, video games digital distribution platform Steam updated their rules regarding what content could be published on the service, introducing a clause that forbids "Content that may violate the rules and standards set forth by Steam’s payment processors and related card networks and banks, or internet network providers." As this policy was introduced, many adult games, particularly those featuring themes of incest, were delisted from the storefront. Steam owner Valve later confirmed in a statement that they had delisted the games after being notified of violating content by payment processors. After this, hundreds of games were reportedly removed from Steam.

Itch.io deindexed all games labeled as adult, saying that they had to take this action to keep their contracts with the payment processors, and would review all games and readd them if they satisfied their review. Itch.io later published a list of types of games that would not be allowed on the service based on the payment processors' content guidelines. Reist said this was not the goal of Collective Shout's campaign, and would expect many of those games to return outside of those that violate the processors' content policies. By August 1, itch.io allowed adult games to be relisted but only if they were offered free of charge to avoid payment processing.

Both Mastercard and Visa have denied that they directed Steam and itch.io to remove specific games, but that both services must still assure content sold using these processors are legal. MasterCard stated "we allow all lawful purchases on our network. At the same time, we require merchants to have appropriate controls to ensure Mastercard cards cannot be used for unlawful purchases, including illegal adult content."

Visa stated "If a transaction is legal, our policy is to process the transaction. We do not make moral judgments on legal purchases made by consumers. Visa does not moderate content sold by merchants, nor do we have visibility into the specific goods or services sold when we process a transaction. When a legally operating merchant faces an elevated risk of illegal activity, we require enhanced safeguards for the banks supporting those merchants."

Valve affirmed that they were not contacted directly by MasterCard, but instead, Valve had to take action to change their moderation terms and remove games from the service as their prior moderation restrictions violated one of Mastercard's rules that disallows use of Mastercard's services for "the sale of a product or service, including an image, which is patently offensive and lacks serious artistic value (such as, by way of example and not limitation, images of nonconsensual sexual behavior, sexual exploitation of a minor, nonconsensual mutilation of a person or body part, and bestiality), or any other material that the Corporation deems unacceptable to sell in connection with a Mark." Stripe, which itch.io had used, said that while they would like to support adult material, one of their banking partners had pushed for removing Stripe payment options for adult games. Valve also affirmed it limited which regions could use PayPal for Steam purchases due to concerns PayPal had with Steam's content that had been raised by PayPal's own payment processors.

== Responses ==
In response to WikiLeaks' financial relationships being severed, Glenn Greenwald formed the Freedom of the Press Foundation to block future attempts by the government to censor the media.

In November 2024, following the shutdown of Manga Library Z, game director Yoko Taro posted critically about the policies of international credit card companies and their impact on the sale of adult content on Twitter. Taro described it as "dangerous on a whole new level," and said that "It implies that by controlling payment processing companies, you can even censor another country’s free speech." Taro opined in a subsequent tweet that the unchecked influence of the companies was "a security hole that endangers democracy itself."

The IGDA said that the association was concerned that the game removals "have been taken with little to no communication and have disproportionately harmed developers producing legal, consensual, and ethically-developed content, including creators from marginalized communities", and was "calling for greater transparency and fairness in how adult games are moderated and actioned across major platforms." GOG.com, a storefront that specializes in sales of games without digital rights management protections, temporally offered a free bundle of controversial but legal adult games, including Postal 2, HuniePop, and House Party, as a form of protest.

Zenko Kurishita, a Japanese activist and former member of the Tokyo Metropolitan Assembly, expressed concern regarding the ongoing censorship of Japanese content platforms in September 2025. He stated that the "immense power" and unclear policies of payment processors resulted in platforms being overly cautious in their compliance.

== See also ==
- Social credit system
- Censorship by copyright
- Corporate censorship
- Criticism of capitalism
- Internet censorship
- Moral panic
