= List of people on the asexual spectrum =

This is a list of notable asexual people who have been open about their sexuality. The number of notable asexual individuals is likely to be several times higher than the number of individuals who appear on this list due to fact that many famous people have hidden their sexual orientations.

People on the asexual spectrum lack sexual attraction to others or experience low or absent interest in or desire for sexual activity. The spectrum includes sub-identities, including gray asexuality and demisexuality. Asexual individuals may represent about one percent of the population.

Many people who identify as asexual also identify with other labels. These other identities include how they define their gender and their romantic orientation. They will oftentimes integrate these characteristics into a greater label that they identify with. Regarding romantic or emotional aspects of sexual orientation or sexual identity, for example, asexuals may identify as heterosexual, lesbian, gay, bisexual, queer or by the following terms to indicate that they associate with the romantic, rather than sexual, aspects of sexual orientation:

- aromantic; no romantic attraction
- biromantic; by analogy to bisexual
- heteroromantic; by analogy to heterosexual
- homoromantic; by analogy to homosexual
- panromantic; by analogy to pansexual

== List ==
Name	Identity	Lifespan	Nationality	Notable as	Ref.
David Archuleta	Demisexual, gay	born 1990	United States	Singer-songwriter	
Rachel Knight (Banshee)	Biromantic asexual		United States	Musician	
Morgan Bell	Asexual	born 1981	Australia	Writer	
Dawn M. Bennett	Demisexual	born 1992	United States	Voice actress	
Yasmin Benoit	Aromantic asexual	born 1996	United Kingdom	Model, activist, and writer	
Marshall Blount	Asexual	born 1993	United States	Activist	
Akemi Dawn Bowman	Asexual spectrum		United States	Author	
Rebecca Burgess	Asexual		United Kingdom	Illustrator and author	
Mary Cagle (Cube Watermelon)	Asexual	born 1989	United States	Webcomic artist	
Mary Chieffo	Panromantic demisexual	born 1992	United States	Actress	
Tulisa Contostavlos	Demisexual	born 1988	United Kingdom	Singer-songwriter, rapper, television personality, and actress	
Sarah Costello	Aromantic asexual		United States	Author, podcast host	
Bradford Cox	Asexual	born 1982	United States	Musician	
Piper Curda	Asexual spectrum	born 1997	United States	Actress, singer	
Cody Daigle-Orians	Asexual, gay, polyamorous	born 1975/1976	United States	Playwright, author, TikToker	
Skyler Davenport	Asexual		United States	Actor	
Kim Deal	Asexual	born 1961	United States	Musician	
Julie Sondra Decker (swankivy)	Aromantic asexual	born 1978	United States	Writer, YouTuber, and activist	
Carolina Dieckmann	Demisexual	born 1978	Brazil	Actress	
Jaiden Dittfach (Jaiden Animations)	Aromantic asexual	born 1997	United States	YouTuber and animator	
Sadie Dupuis	Demisexual, bisexual	born 1988	United States	Musician	
Evan Edinger	Demisexual	born 1990	United States/United Kingdom	YouTuber	
Giovanna Ewbank	Demisexual	born 1986	Brazil	Actress, model, and television presenter	
Ana Gabriel	Asexual	born 1955	Mexico	Singer-songwriter	
Nesey Gallons	Asexual, omnisexual	born 1984	United States	Musician	
Janeane Garofalo	Asexual	born 1964	United States	Comedian, actress	
Jared Gilman	Asexual	born 1998	United States	Actor	
Luciana Gimenez	Demisexual	born 1969	Brazil	Model	
Lily Gladstone	Demisexual	born 1986	United States	Actress	
Kellen Goff	Demisexual, bisexual	born 1995	United States	Voice actor	
Mel Gonçalves	Demisexual	born 1991	Brazil	Actress	
Celia Rose Gooding	Gray asexual, bisexual	born 2000	United States	Actress and singer	
Bonnie Gordon	Graysexual, pansexual	born 1986	United States	Actress, musician	
Edward Gorey	Asexual	1925–2000	United States	Writer, costume designer, and artist	
Bruna Griphao	Demisexual	born 1999	Brazil	Actress	
Tim Gunn	Asexual, gay	born 1953	United States	Author, academic, and television personality	
Damien Haas (Smosh)	Demisexual	born 1990	United States/Germany	YouTuber, Twitch streamer, voice actor	
Hansol	Asexual	born 1994	South Korea	K-pop musician	
Mavournee Hazel	Demisexual	born 1996	Australia	Actress	
Samantha Hudson	Asexual	born 1999	Spain	Artist, actress, musician	
Keri Hulme	Aromantic asexual	1947–2021	New Zealand	Novelist, poet and short-story writer	
Iza	Demisexual	born 1990	Brazil	Singer-songwriter and dancer	
Karl Jacobs	Asexual spectrum	born 1998	United States	YouTuber	
David Jay	Asexual	born 1982	United States	Asexual activist	
Caitlyn Jenner	Asexual	born 1949	United States	Media personality and retired Olympic gold medal-winning decathlete	
Emily Kate Johnston	Demisexual	born 1984	Canada	Author	
Shayna McHayle (Junglepussy)	Asexual	born 1991	United States	Rapper, musician	
Yuhki Kamatani	Asexual	born 1983	Japan	Manga artist and illustrator	
Alex Kazemi	Demisexual	born 1994	Canada	Pop artist, author, journalist and CEO of VOID Collective	
Isis King	Asexual spectrum	born 1985	United States	Actress, model, and fashion designer	
TJ Klune	Asexual	born 1982	United States	Author of fantasy and romantic fiction	
Maia Kobabe	Asexual	born 1989	United States	Cartoonist and author	
Max Konnor	Demisexual	born 1986 or 1987	United States/France	Pornographic film actor	
Rafael Lange Severino (Cellbit)	Asexual	born 1997	Brazil	YouTuber, Twitch streamer	
Aline Laurent-Mayard	Aromantic asexual		France	Journalist, podcast host	
Marissa Lenti	Asexual	born 1992	United States	Voice actor and ADR director	
Darcie Little Badger	Asexual	born 1987	United States	Author and earth scientist	
Gabriel Mac	Asexual, gay		United States	Author and journalist	
Seanan McGuire	Demisexual, pansexual, bisexual	born 1978	United States	Author and filker	
Ashley McKenzie	Asexual spectrum	born 1984	Canada	Film director, screenwriter, and editor	
Vivienne Medrano (Vivziepop)	Asexual spectrum	born 1992	United States	Animator	
Erica Mendez	Asexual		United States	Voice actress	
Courtney Miller (Smosh)	Demisexual, pansexual	born 1995	United States	YouTuber	
Satsuki Nakayama	Asexual	born 1998	Japan	Model and actor	
Mikey Neumann	Asexual	born 1982	United States	YouTuber and video game writer	
Marieke Nijkamp	Homoromantic asexual	born 1986	Netherlands	Writer	
Catie Osborn (Catieosaurus)	Demisexual, gray asexual, bisexual, pansexual, polyamorous		United States	TikToker, actor, podcaster, sex educator, adult performer and mental health and disability advocate	
Alice Oseman	Aromantic asexual	born 1994	United Kingdom	Author of young adult fiction	
Michael Paramo	Asexual and aromantic spectrums, queer		United States	Writer, academic and artist	
Alanah Pearce	Demisexual, pansexual	born 1993	Australia	Video game writer, journalist	
Pauley Perrette	Asexual, aromantic	born 1969	United States	Actress	
Paula Poundstone	Asexual	born 1959	United States	Stand-up comedian, author, actor, interviewer, and commentator	
Jacob Rabon IV (Alpharad)	Asexual and aromantic spectrums, bisexual	born 1995	United States	YouTuber, esports personality, and musician	
Lana Rhoades	Asexual	born 1996	United States	Former pornographic actress	
Kayleigh Amstutz (Chappell Roan)	Demisexual lesbian	born 1998	United States	Singer-songwriter and drag queen	
Lucy Rose	Asexual	born 1996	United Kingdom	Filmmaker, author	
José Santos Salas	Asexual	1888-1955	Chile	Physician and politician	
Jim Sinclair	Asexual		United States	Activist	
Pragati Singh	Gray asexual		India	Doctor, public health official, and activist	
Robin Daniel Skinner (Cavetown)	Asexual and aromantic spectrums	born 1998	United Kingdom	Singer-songwriter, record producer, and YouTuber	
Abby Stein	Demisexual, queer, polyamorous	born 1991	Israel/United States	Rabbi, author, and activist	
Markki Stroem	Demisexual	born 1987	Philippines/Norway	Actor, singer	
Sweet Anita	Demisexual	born 1990	United Kingdom	Twitch streamer and YouTuber	
Nico Tortorella	Demisexual, bisexual	born 1988	United States	Actor, model	
Kimlinh Tran	Asexual	born 1989	United States	Voice actor	
D'Angelo Wallace	Aromantic asexual	born 1998	United States	YouTuber	
Jeremy Whitley	Asexual spectrum	born 1983	United States	Comic book writer and artist	
Merc Fenn Wolfmoor	Aromantic asexual	born 1986	United States	Author of speculative fiction	

== See also ==
- List of fictional asexual characters
- List of people on the aromantic spectrum
- Lists of LGBTQ figures in fiction and myth
