= 36th Lambda Literary Awards =

2024 awards ceremony for LGBTQ+ literature

- Awarded for: Works of LGBTQ+ literature
- Date: June 11, 2024
- Location: New York City
- Country: United States
- Presented by: Lambda Literary Foundation
- Eligibility: LGBTQ+ storytelling, published in the US in 2023
- Website: www.lambdaliterary.org/awards

The finalists for the 36th Lambda Literary Awards, which honor works of LGBTQ+ literature published in 2023, were announced on March 27, 2024. The winners were announced at Sony Hall in New York on June 11, 2024.

== Special awards ==
In this year there were seven special prizes, including two new awards: The Denneny Award for Editorial Excellence, named for history-making gay editor Michael Denneny, who died in 2023, and The Pat Holt Prize for Critical Arts Writing in honor of late San Francisco Chronicle book review editor Patricia Holt.

Special awards recipients
Category	Winner	Ref
Jeanne Córdova Prize for Lesbian/Queer Nonfiction	Stephanie Davies	
Jim Duggins Outstanding Mid-Career Novelists' Prize	K.M. Soehnlein, Zelda Lockhart	
Judith A. Markowitz Emerging Writer Award	Federico Erebia, River 瑩瑩 Dandelion	
J. Michael Samuel Prize for Emerging Writers Over 50	Paul Festa	
Randall Kenan Prize for Black LGBTQ Fiction	Liv Little	
The Denneny Award for Editorial Excellence	Remi Recchia	
The Pat Holt Prize for Critical Arts Writing	Elizabeth Hoover	

== Nominees and winners ==
36th Lambda Literary Awards winners and finalists
Category	Author	Title	Publisher	Result	Ref.
Bisexual Fiction	Ling Ling Huang	Natural Beauty	Penguin Random House / Dutton	Winner	
Bisexual Fiction	Ruth Madievsky	All-Night Pharmacy: A Novel	Catapult	Finalist	
Bisexual Fiction	Jennifer Savran Kelly	Endpapers	Algonquin Books	Finalist	
Bisexual Fiction	Sarah James	Last Night at the Hollywood Canteen	Sourcebooks	Finalist	
Bisexual Fiction	Haley Jakobson	Old Enough	Penguin Random House / Dutton	Finalist	
Bisexual Nonfiction	Myriam Gurba	Creep: Accusations and Confessions	Avid Reader Press	Winner	
Bisexual Nonfiction	Vaneet Mehta	Bisexual Men Exist: A Handbook for Bisexual, Pansexual and M-Spec Men	Jessica Kingsley Publishers	Finalist	
Bisexual Nonfiction	Zachary Zane	Boyslut: A Memoir and Manifesto	Abrams Image	Finalist	
Bisexual Nonfiction	Eden Boudreau	Crying Wolf	Book*hug Press	Finalist	
Bisexual Nonfiction	Kawika Guillermo	Nimrods: A fake-punk self-hurt anti-memoir	Duke University Press	Finalist	
Bisexual Poetry	Danielle Cadena Deulen	Desire Museum	BOA Editions	Winner	
Bisexual Poetry	Mary Jo Bang	A Film in Which I Play Everyone	Graywolf Press	Finalist	
Bisexual Poetry	Sierra DeMulder	Ephemera	Button Poetry	Finalist	
Bisexual Poetry	Margaret Ray	Good Grief, the Ground	BOA Editions	Finalist	
Bisexual Poetry	Paul Killebrew	Impersonal Rainbow and The Bisexual Purge	Canarium Books	Finalist	
Gay Fiction	Bryan Washington	Family Meal	Penguin Random House / Riverhead Books	Winner	
Gay Fiction	Patrick E. Horrigan	American Scholar	Lethe Press	Finalist	
Gay Fiction	Justin Torres	Blackouts	Farrar, Straus and Giroux	Finalist	
Gay Fiction	Richard Mirabella	Brother and Sister Enter the Forest: A Novel	Catapult	Finalist	
Gay Fiction	Khashayar J. Khabushani	I Will Greet the Sun Again	Hogarth Books	Finalist	
Gay Memoir/Biography	Jason Yamas	Tweakerworld	Unnamed Press	Winner	
Gay Memoir/Biography	Charles Busch	Leading Lady	BenBella Books	Finalist	
Gay Memoir/Biography	Greg Marshall	Leg: The Story of a Limb and the Boy Who Grew from It	Abrams Press	Finalist	
Gay Memoir/Biography	Jedidiah Jenkins	Mother, Nature	Convergent Books	Finalist	
Gay Memoir/Biography	Martin Duberman	Reaching Ninety	Chicago Review Press	Finalist	
Gay Poetry	Charif Shanahan	Trace Evidence	Tin House	Winner	
Gay Poetry	Paul Stephenson	Hard Drive	Carcanet Press	Finalist	
Gay Poetry	Richard Blanco	Homeland of My Body: New and Selected Poems	Beacon Press	Finalist	
Gay Poetry	Emanuel Xavier	Love(ly) Child	Rebel Satori Press	Finalist	
Gay Poetry	Grant Chemidlin	What We Lost in the Swamp	Central Avenue Poetry	Finalist	
Gay Romance	Cat Sebastian	We Could Be So Good	Avon Books	Winner	
Gay Romance	E. H. Lupton	Dionysus in Wisconsin	Winnowing Fan Press	Finalist	
Gay Romance	M. A. Wardell	Mistletoe and Mishigas	Self-published	Finalist	
Gay Romance	Jay Hogan	The Art of Husbandry	Southern Lights Publishing / Self-published	Finalist	
Gay Romance	K.J. Charles	The Secret Lives of Country Gentlemen	Sourcebooks	Finalist	
Lesbian Fiction	Catherine Lacey	Biography of X	Farrar, Straus and Giroux	Winner	
Lesbian Fiction	Jen Beagin	Big Swiss	Scribner	Finalist	
Lesbian Fiction	K-Ming Chang	Organ Meats	One World	Finalist	
Lesbian Fiction	C. E. McGill	Our Hideous Progeny	HarperCollins	Finalist	
Lesbian Fiction	Helen Elaine Lee	Pomegranate	Atria Books	Finalist	
Lesbian Memoir/Biography	Amelia Possanza	Lesbian Love Story: A Memoir in Archives	Catapult	Winner	
Lesbian Memoir/Biography	Lamya H	Hijab Butch Blues	The Dial Press	Finalist	
Lesbian Memoir/Biography	Vi Khi Nao	Suicide: The Autoimmune Disorder of the Psyche	11:11 Press	Finalist	
Lesbian Memoir/Biography	Sarah Viren	To Name the Bigger Lie	Scribner	Finalist	
Lesbian Memoir/Biography	Lynnée Denise	Why Willie Mae Thornton Matters	The University of Texas Press	Finalist	
Lesbian Poetry	Kimberly Alidio	Teeter	Nightboat Books	Winner	
Lesbian Poetry	Alyse Knorr	Ardor	Gasher Press	Finalist	
Lesbian Poetry	Brionne Janae	Because You Were Mine	Haymarket Books	Finalist	
Lesbian Poetry	Maggie Millner	Couplets	Farrar, Straus and Giroux	Finalist	
Lesbian Poetry	Stephanie Adams-Santos	Dream of Xibalba	Orison Books	Finalist	
Lesbian Romance	Georgia Beers	Dance with Me	Bold Strokes Books	Winner	
Lesbian Romance	Marianne Ratcliffe	A Lady to Treasure	Bellows Press	Finalist	
Lesbian Romance	Kris Bryant	Catch	Bold Strokes Books	Finalist	
Lesbian Romance	Lisa Peers	Love at 350°	The Dial Press	Finalist	
Lesbian Romance	Melissa Brayden	Lucky in Lace	Bold Strokes Books	Finalist	
LGBTQ Anthology	Tuck Woodstock and Niko Stratis	2 Trans 2 Furious: An Extremely Serious Journal of Transgender Street Racing Studies	Rapid Onset Gender Distro / Self-published	Winner	
LGBTQ Anthology	Andrew R. Spieldenner and Jeffrey Escoffier	A Pill for Promiscuity: Gay Sex in an Age of Pharmaceuticals	Rutgers University Press	Finalist	
LGBTQ Anthology	Madeline Dyer; with contributions by Cody Daigle-Orians, Kat Yuen, Akemi Dawn Bowman, Rosiee Thor, Madeline Dyer, Linsey Miller, K. Hart, S. E. Anderson, Emily Victoria, Anju Imura, RoAnna Sylver, Moniza Hossain, Lara Ameen, Jas Brown, and S. J. Taylor	Being Ace: An Anthology of Queer, Trans, Femme, and Disabled Stories of Asexual Love and Connection	Page Street Publishing / Page Street YA	Finalist	
LGBTQ Anthology	Bogi Takács; with contributions by Cameron Van Sant, Celia Neri, D. A. Xiaolin Spires, Emma Alice Johnson, Hal Y. Zhang, Isha Karki, Jennifer Lee Rossman, Julian K. Jarboe, Julie Nováková, Kanika Agrawal, Laura Jane Swanson, Leigh Harlen, Lisa M. Bradley, Lydia Moon, Osahon Ize-Iyamu, Phoebe Barton, Polenth Blake, Premee Mohamed, Santiago Belluco, Stefani Cox, Tessa Fisher, Ursula Whitcher, and Vajra Chandrasekera	Rosalind's Siblings: Fiction and Poetry Celebrating Scientists of Marginalized Genders	Atthis Arts	Finalist	
LGBTQ Anthology	Benjamin Schaefer	Fairy Tale Review: The Rainbow Issue	Wayne State University Press	Finalist	
LGBTQ Children's	Nina LaCour; illustrated by Sonia Albert	The Apartment House on Poppy Hill	Chronicle Books	Winner	
LGBTQ Children's	Meeg Pincus and Meridth Mckean Gimbel	Door by Door	Crown Books for Young Readers	Finalist	
LGBTQ Children's	Andy Passchier	Gender Identity for Kids	Little, Brown Books for Young Readers	Finalist	
LGBTQ Children's	Harry Woodgate	Grandad's Pride	Little Bee Books	Finalist	
LGBTQ Children's	A. J. Irving and Kip Alizadeh	The Wishing Flower	Knopf Books for Young Readers	Finalist	
LGBTQ Comics	E. M. Carroll	A Guest in The House	First Second	Winner	
LGBTQ Comics	Mari Costa	Belle of the Ball	First Second	Finalist	
LGBTQ Comics	Lawrence Lindell	Blackward	Drawn & Quarterly	Finalist	
LGBTQ Comics	Jillian Tamaki and Mariko Tamaki	Roaming	Drawn & Quarterly	Finalist	
LGBTQ Comics	H. A.	The Chromatic Fantasy	Silver Sprocket	Finalist	
LGBTQ Drama	James Ijames	Fat Ham	Theatre Communications Group	Winner	
LGBTQ Drama	Adam Meisner	For Both Resting and Breeding	Scirocco Drama / J. Gordon Shillingford Publishing	Finalist	
LGBTQ Drama	Andrew Rincón	I Wanna Fuck Like Romeo and Juliet	Samuel French, a Concord Theatricals Company	Finalist	
LGBTQ Drama	Milo Wippermann	Joan of Arkansas	Ugly Duckling Presse	Finalist	
LGBTQ Drama	Harrison David Rivers	The bandaged place	Samuel French, a Concord Theatricals Company	Finalist	
LGBTQ+ Romance and Erotica	Laura Q	A Tight Squeeze: Smutty Trans and Queer Stories	Microcosm Publishing	Winner	
LGBTQ+ Romance and Erotica	T. J. Alexander	Chef's Choice	Emily Bestler Books / Atria Books	Finalist	
LGBTQ+ Romance and Erotica	Andie Burke	Fly with Me: A Novel	St. Martin's Griffin	Finalist	
LGBTQ+ Romance and Erotica	Ashley Herring Blake	Iris Kelly Doesn't Date	Berkley	Finalist	
LGBTQ+ Romance and Erotica	Alexandria Bellefleur	The Fiancee Farce	Avon Books	Finalist	
LGBTQ Middle Grade	Robin Gow	Dear Mothman	Amulet Books	Winner	
LGBTQ Middle Grade	Leah Johnson	Ellie Engle Saves Herself	Disney Hyperion	Finalist	
LGBTQ Middle Grade	Karen Wilfrid	Just Lizzie	HarperCollins / Clarion Books	Finalist	
LGBTQ Middle Grade	Michael Leali	Matteo	HarperCollins	Finalist	
LGBTQ Middle Grade	Alden Van Otterloo	The Beautiful Something Else	Scholastic Press	Finalist	
LGBTQ Mystery	Cari Hunter	A Calculated Risk	Bold Strokes Books	Winner	
LGBTQ Mystery	Rebecca McKanna	Don't Forget the Girl	Sourcebooks Landmark	Finalist	
LGBTQ Mystery	Polly Stewart	The Good Ones	HarperCollins	Finalist	
LGBTQ Mystery	J. M. Redmann	Transitory	Bold Strokes Books	Finalist	
LGBTQ Mystery	Joshua Moehling	Where the Dead Sleep	Poisoned Pen Press	Finalist	
LGBTQ Nonfiction	Matt Baume	Hi Honey, I'm Homo	BenBella Books	Winner	
LGBTQ Nonfiction	Daniel Black	Black on Black: On Our Resilience and Brilliance in America	Harlequin Trade Publishing / Hanover Square Press	Finalist	
LGBTQ Nonfiction	Elyssa Maxx Goodman	Glitter and Concrete: A Cultural History of Drag in New York City	Harlequin Trade Publishing / Hanover Square Press	Finalist	
LGBTQ Nonfiction	Julie Marie Wade	Otherwise	Autumn House Press	Finalist	
LGBTQ Nonfiction	John Sovec, LMFT	Out: A Parent's Guide to Supporting Your LGBTQIA+ Kid Through Coming Out and Beyond	Jessica Kingsley Publishers	Finalist	
LGBTQ Poetry	Quinn Carver Johnson	The Perfect Bastard	Northwestern University Press	Winner	
LGBTQ Poetry	Robin Gow	Lanternfly August	Driftwood Press	Finalist	
LGBTQ Poetry	Destiny Hemphill	Motherworld: A devotional for the alter-life	Action Books	Finalist	
LGBTQ Poetry	Sam Sax	Pig	Scribner	Finalist	
LGBTQ Poetry	Alina Pleskova	Toska	Deep Vellum	Finalist	
LGBTQ Speculative Fiction	Marisa Crane	I Keep My Exoskeletons to Myself	Catapult	Winner	
LGBTQ Speculative Fiction	Aubrey Wood	Bang Bang Bodhisattva	Solaris	Finalist	
LGBTQ Speculative Fiction	Emma Mieko Candon	The Archive Undying	Tordotcom Publishing	Finalist	
LGBTQ Speculative Fiction	Vajra Chandrasekera	The Saint of Bright Doors	Tordotcom Publishing	Finalist	
LGBTQ Speculative Fiction	Chana Porter	The Thick and the Lean	Saga Press	Finalist	
LGBTQ Studies	Erin L. Durban	The Sexual Politics of Empire: Postcolonial Homophobia in Haiti	University of Illinois Press	Winner	
LGBTQ Studies	Jennifer Dominique Jones	Ambivalent Affinities: A Political History of Blackness and Homosexuality after World War II	University of North Carolina Press	Finalist	
LGBTQ Studies	Christoph Hanssmann	Care without Pathology: How Trans Health Activists Are Changing Medicine	University of Minnesota Press	Finalist	
LGBTQ Studies	Margot Canaday	Queer Career: Sexuality and Work in Modern America	Princeton University Press	Finalist	
LGBTQ Studies	Travis S. K. Kong	Sexuality and the Rise of China: The Post-1990s Gay Generation in Hong Kong, Taiwan, and Mainland China	Duke University Press	Finalist	
LGBTQ Young Adult	Abdi Nazemian	Only This Beautiful Moment	HarperCollins / Balzer + Bray	Winner	
LGBTQ Young Adult	Maxine Rae	Cold Girls	Flux	Finalist	
LGBTQ Young Adult	Keith F. Miller Jr.	Pritty	HarperCollins / HarperTeen	Finalist	
LGBTQ Young Adult	Brittany N. Williams	That Self-Same Metal (The Forge & Fracture Saga, Book 1)	Amulet Books	Finalist	
LGBTQ Young Adult	Gabe Cole Novoa	The Wicked Bargain	Random House Books for Young Readers	Finalist	
Transgender Fiction	Soula Emmanuel	Wild Geese	Feminist Press	Winner	
Transgender Fiction	Nicola Dinan	Bellies	Hanover Square Press	Finalist	
Transgender Fiction	Emily Zhou	Girlfriends	LittlePuss Press	Finalist	
Transgender Fiction	Valérie Bah; translated by Kama La Mackerel	The Rage Letters	Metonymy Press	Finalist	
Transgender Fiction	Sylvia Aguilar Zéleny	Trash	Deep Vellum	Finalist	
Transgender Nonfiction	Miss Major Griffin-Gracy and Toshio Meronek	Miss Major Speaks: Conversations with a Black Trans Revolutionary	Verso Books	Winner	
Transgender Nonfiction	McKenzie Wark	Love and Money, Sex and Death	Verso Books	Finalist	
Transgender Nonfiction	Casey Plett	On Community	Biblioasis	Finalist	
Transgender Nonfiction	Stacy Jane Grover	Tar Hollow Trans: Essays	University Press of Kentucky	Finalist	
Transgender Nonfiction	Mx. Sly	Transland: Consent, Kink, and Pleasure	Arsenal Pulp Press	Finalist	
Transgender Poetry	Michal 'MJ' Jones	Hood Vacations	Black Lawrence Press	Winner	
Transgender Poetry	Victoriano Cárdenas	Portraits as Animal: Poems	Bloomsday Literary	Finalist	
Transgender Poetry	K. Iver	Short Film Starring My Beloved's Red Bronco	Milkweed Editions	Finalist	
Transgender Poetry	Jennifer Conlon	Taking to Water	Autumn House Press	Finalist	
Transgender Poetry	Subhaga Crystal Bacon	Transitory	BOA Editions	Finalist	
