= List of people on the aromantic spectrum =

This is a list of notable aromantic people who have been open about their romantic orientation. The number of notable aromantic individuals is likely to be several times higher than the number of individuals who appear on this list due to fact that many famous people have hidden their romantic orientations.

Aromanticism is a romantic orientation characterized by experiencing little to no romantic attraction. The term "aromantic", colloquially shortened to "aro", refers to a person who identifies their romantic orientation as aromanticism.

Many people on the aromantic spectrum may also identify with other labels such as different sexual orientation or sexual identity, such as asexual, heterosexual, gay, lesbian, bisexual or queer.

== List ==
Name	Identity	Lifespan	Nationality	Notable as	Ref.
Yasmin Benoit	Aromantic asexual	born 1996	England	Model, activist, and writer	
Michaela Coel	Aromantic	born 1987	England	Screenwriter, actress	
Sarah Costello	Aromantic asexual		United States	Author, podcast host	
Julie Sondra Decker (swankivy)	Aromantic asexual	born 1978	United States	Writer, YouTuber, and activist	
Jaiden Dittfach (Jaiden Animations)	Aromantic asexual	born 1997	United States	YouTuber and animator	
Connie Glynn	Aromantic bisexual, polyamorous	born 1994	England	YouTuber, author	
Sam Helmick	Aromantic asexual		United States	Librarian	
Keri Hulme	Aromantic asexual	1947–2021	New Zealand	Novelist, poet and short-story writer	
Aline Laurent-Mayard	Aromantic asexual		France	Journalist, podcast host	
Alice Oseman	Aromantic asexual	born 1994	England	Author	
Michael Paramo	Aromantic and asexual spectrums	born 1993	United States	Writer, academic, artist	
Jacob Rabon IV (Alpharad)	Aromantic and asexual spectrums, bisexual	born 1995	United States	YouTuber, esports personality, and musician	
Robin Daniel Skinner (Cavetown)	Aromantic and asexual spectrums	born 1998	England	Singer-songwriter, record producer, and YouTuber	
Merc Fenn Wolfmoor	Aromantic asexual, queer	born 1986	United States	Author of speculative fiction	

== See also ==
- List of people on the asexual spectrum
