= Sj Miller =

American academic and activist (born 1970)

sj Miller
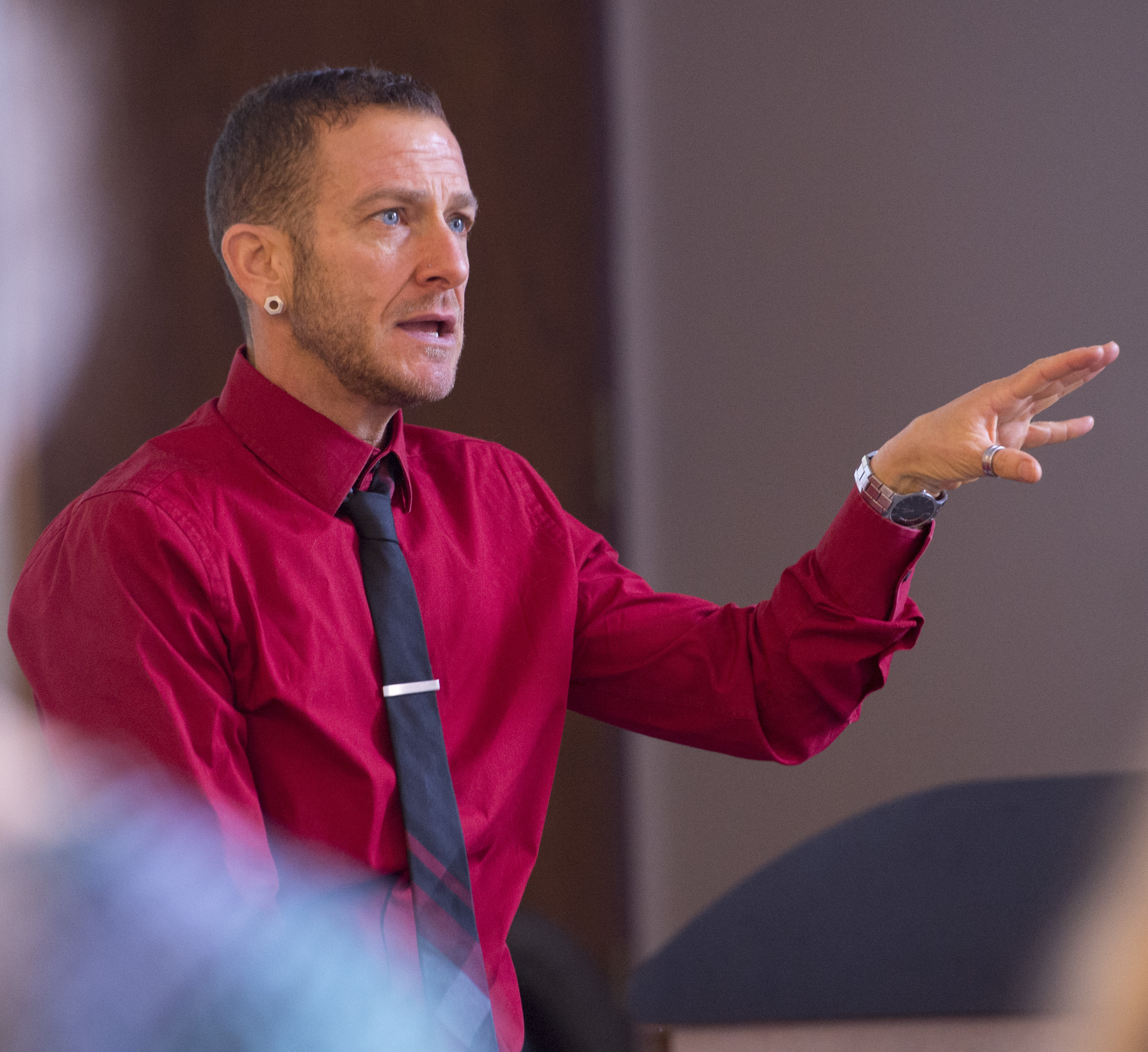
- Born: March 20, 1970 (age 56); New Orleans, Louisiana, US
- Occupations: Professor, human rights activist

Academic background
- Education: University of New Mexico

Academic work
- Discipline: Teacher education
- Institutions: Indiana University of Pennsylvania; University of Missouri-Kansas City; University of Colorado Boulder; New York University
- Website: www.sjmiller.info

sj Miller (born March 20, 1970) is an American academic whose work commonly centers around social justice, literacy, and the confluence of gender and education. Miller is a professor of Teacher Education.

== Early life and education ==
Miller was born in New Orleans, Louisiana, and grew up in Santa Fe, New Mexico, attending Santa Fe High School. Miller taught middle and high school English for eight years before going on to earn a PhD in Educational Thought and Socio-Cultural Studies from the University of New Mexico.

Miller medically and socially transitioned to appear male while working as an assistant professor at Indiana University of Pennsylvania, and self-described, starting at that time, as trans-agender. Miller was disowned by Miller's father after coming out as transgender.

== Career ==
Miller has held teaching positions at Indiana University of Pennsylvania, University of Missouri-Kansas City, and as associate professor of literacy studies at University of Colorado Boulder. In 2016, Miller was hired as deputy director of Educational Equity at the Steinhardt School of Culture, Education, and Human Development at New York University.

Miller is a professor of Teacher Education and holds an additional appointment teaching online courses in a teacher education program.

== Advocacy ==
In the fall of 2010, Miller helped draft the Beliefs Statement about Social Justice in English Education and helped pass the Resolution on Social Justice in Literacy Education, which informed the newly-vetted CAEP Social Justice Standard 6, the first ever standard in the United States that advances social justice work in teacher preparation for the National Council of Teachers of English. In April 2016, Miller was selected for a project hosted by the UNESCO Mahatma Gandhi Institute of Education for Peace and Sustainable Development to integrate social justice education into the mainstream school curriculum. Miller has written and spoken about the impact of bullying on youth, particularly young people whose gender identities are nonconforming and those in the LGBTQIA+ community.

== Selected awards and recognition ==
- 2005: Paul and Kate Farmer English Journal Writing Award, Article of the Year, "Shattering Images of Violence in Young Adult Literature: Strategies for the Classroom"
- 2007: Exemplary Book Award, Richard A. Meade Award, National Council on Teacher Education, "Unpacking the Loaded Teacher Matrix: Negotiating Space and Time Between University and Secondary English Classrooms"
- 2015: Joanne Arnold Courage and Commitment Award, University of Colorado Boulder
- 2017: Exemplary Research Award, American Educational Research Association, Division K, Teaching and Teacher Education, "Teaching, Affirming and Recognizing Trans and Gender Creative Youth: A Queer Literacy Framework"
- 2019: AERA Distinguished Contributions to Gender Equity in Education Research Award

== Selected publications ==
=== Books ===
- Miller, sj (2007). Unpacking the loaded teacher matrix: Negotiating space and time between university and secondary English classrooms. Peter Lang. ISBN 978-0820486765.
- Miller, sj (2008). Narratives of social justice teaching: How English teachers negotiate theory and practice between preservice and inservice spaces. Peter Lang. ISBN 978-1433101274.
- Miller, sj (2010). Change matters: Critical essays on moving social justice research from theory to policy. Peter Lang. ISBN 978-1433106828.
- Miller, sj; Burns, L.; Johnson, T.S. (2013). Generation BULLIED 2.0: Prevention and intervention strategies for our most vulnerable students. Peter Lang. ISBN 978-1433120718.
- sj Miller, ed. (2016). Teaching, affirming, and recognizing trans and gender creative youth: A queer literacy framework. Palgrave Macmillan. ISBN 978-1-349-92939-9.
- Miller, sj (2016). Educators queering academia: Critical memoirs. Peter Lang. ISBN 9781433134302.
- Miller, sj (2018). Enseñando, afirmando, y reconociendo a jóvenes trans* y de género creative: Un marco de enseñanza quee. Ediciones Universidad Alberto Hurtado. ISBN 978-9563571363.
- Miller, sj; Mayo, C.; Hoskin, R.; Green, J. (2019). Navigating trans*+ and complex gender identities. Bloomsbury. ISBN 9781350061057.
- Miller, sj (2019). About gender identity justice in schools and communities. Teachers College Press. ISBN 978-0807761250.
- Miller, sj (2026). We Refuse to Disappear: Resistance Amid Anti-Trans Education Policy. Harvard Educational Publishing Group. ISBN 9798895571217.

=== Publications ===
- Miller, s. (May 2005). "Shattering Images of Violence in Young Adult Literature: Strategies for the Classroom". English Journal. 94 (5): 87–93. doi:10.2307/30047360. JSTOR 30047360.
- Miller, s (2012). "Mythology of the norm: Disrupting the culture of bullying in schools". English Journal. 101 (6): 107–109. doi:10.58680/ej201220561.
- Miller, sj; Alsup, Janet (April 2014). "Reclaiming English Education: Rooting Social Justice in Dispositions". English Education. 46 (3). NCTE: 195–215. doi:10.58680/ee201424659.
- Miller, s (2014). "Text complexity and "comparable literary merit" in young adult literature". The ALAN Review. 41 (2): 44–55. doi:10.21061/alan.v41i2.a.5.
- Miller, sj (2015). "A queer literacy framework promoting (a)gender and (a)sexuality self-determination and justice". English Journal. 104 (3): 37–44. doi:10.58680/ej201527209.
- Miller, sj. "Social justice policymaking in teacher education from conception to application: Realizing Standard VI". Teachers College Record. 119 (2): 1–38.
- Miller, sj (2018). "Sex and gender in transition in US schools: Ways forward". Sex Education. 18 (4): 345–359. doi:10.1080/14681811.2017.1415204.
- Miller, sj (2018). "Reframing schooling to liberate gender identity". Multicultural Perspectives. 20 (2): 70–80. doi:10.1080/15210960.2018.1447067.
- Miller, sj. "Discussing transgender topics within gay-straight alliances: Factors that could promote more frequent conversations". International Journal of Transgenderism. 7 (19): 119–131.
- Miller, sj (2018). Theoretical models and processes of literacy edition 7. Routledge.
- Miller, sj (2019). "The Impact and Role of Emotions in Schools for Teachers and Students with Complex Gender Identities". Teachers College Record. 121 (13): 1–16. doi:10.1177/016146811912101307.
- Miller, sj (2020). "Gender Identity Complexities Turn". GLQ: A Journal of Lesbian and Gay Studies. 26 (2): 239–242. doi:10.1215/10642684-8141816.
- Mayo, Cris (2019). Mayo, Cris; Blackburn, Mollie V. (eds.). Queer, Trans, and Intersectional Theory in Educational Practice: Student, Teacher, and Community Experiences (1st ed.). Routledge. doi:10.4324/9780367816469. ISBN 978-0-367-81646-9.

=== Edited series ===
- Miller, sj. Spaces In-between: Beyond Binary Gender Identities and Sexualities Series. Teachers College Press.
- Miller, sj. Social Justice Across Contexts in Education. Peter Lang.

== Personal life ==
Miller enjoys participating in sports, including swimming, running, and cycling, and received a full ride scholarship to U.C. Berkeley to play soccer. Miller is also a cat trainer and owns a cat parkour training business.

Miller is agender and does not use any personal pronouns.
