= Louisa Elizabeth Allen =

New Zealand sex education academic (born 1972)

- Born: 1972 (age 53–54)
- Education: University of Cambridge
- Scientific career
- Fields: sex education
- Thesis: 'Exploring relationships' : a study of young people's (hetero)sexual subjectivities, knowledge and practices. (2000)

Louisa Elizabeth Allen (born 1972) is a New Zealand sex education academic. She is currently a full professor at the University of Auckland.

== Academic career ==
After a 2000 PhD titled Exploring relationships' : a study of young people's (hetero)sexual subjectivities, knowledge and practices.' at the University of Cambridge, she moved to the University of Auckland, rising to full professor.

== Selected works ==
- Allen, Louisa. "Girls want sex, boys want love: Resisting dominant discourses of (hetero) sexuality." Sexualities 6, no. 2 (2003): 215–236.
- Allen, Louisa. Sexual subjects: Young people, sexuality and education. Springer, 2005.
- Allen, Louisa. "Beyond the birds and the bees: Constituting a discourse of erotics in sexuality education." Gender and education 16, no. 2 (2004): 151–167.
- Allen, Louisa. "‘Say everything’: Exploring young people's suggestions for improving sexuality education." Sex Education 5, no. 4 (2005): 389-404.
- Allen, Louisa. "Closing sex education's knowledge/practice gap: the reconceptualisation of young people's sexual knowledge." Sex Education: Sexuality, Society and Learning 1, no. 2 (2001): 109–122.
- Allen, Louisa. "Managing masculinity: Young men's identity work in focus groups." Qualitative Research 5, no. 1 (2005): 35–57.
