= Lirio =

Lirio may refer to:

== People ==
- Bruna Lirio (born 1994), Brazilian model
- Carmen de Lirio (1926–2014), Spanish film actress
- Lirio Abbate Abbate (born 1971), Italian journalist
- Lírio Negro (born 1979), Brazilian activist
- Sheila Lirio Marcelo Marcelo (born 1970), Filipino-American entrepreneur

== Places ==
- Lirio, Lombardy, Italy
- Monte Lirio, Panama

== Other ==
- Lirio (story), short story by Peter Solis Nery
