= Being Aro =

2026 anthology

Being Aro: A Collection of Aromantic Fiction about Love, Connection, and Empowerment
- Editor: Madeline Dyer and Rosiee Thor
- Genre: Anthology; LGBTQ literature; Varied
- Publisher: Page Street Kids
- Publication date: May 26, 2026
- Pages: 304
- ISBN: 979-8890034427
- Preceded by: Being Ace

Being Aro: A Collection of Aromantic Fiction about Love, Connection, and Empowerment is a 2026 short story anthology edited by Madeline Dyer and Rosie Thor. It features twelve stories with aromantic protagonists. The book is a follow-up of 2023's Being Ace, which was also edited by Dyer and in which Thor was an contributor.

== Stories ==
- "Kimberly Ma Meets Her Match" by Ann Zha
- "The Binding" by Soumi Roy
- "Lovesick" by Taka Owen
- "Preservation" by Kemi Ashing-Giwa
- "Joust Friends" by Rosiee Thor
- "Thomas Marley's Fake Bride" by Ian M. Carlisle
- "Swordmaiden" by Kalyn Josephson
- "Flying Solo" by Claudie Arseneault
- "Paper Rebellions" by Rukman Ragas
- "Do You See Me?" by Isa Fiel
- "Daughter of Time" by Madeline Dyer
- "Indulge the Other" by Laura Pohl

The book includes an introduction by Julie Sondra Decker.

== Reception ==
Kirkus Reviews concluded that the work offered "welcome aro representation exploring a wealth of complex worlds and identities," further noting the diversity of genres. Publishers Weekly gave the anthology a starred review, saying "each story matter-of-factly approaches aromantic experiences and amplifies their importance as part of queer culture." In another starred review, Fin Leary of Booklist noted the varying importance of the characters' aromantic identity across the different stories, and closed the review by stating "the anthology proves with pizazz and shine how expansive platonic and familial self-love can be and shows that aromantic protagonists belong in every type of story."
