= Fierce Femmes and Notorious Liars =

2016 novel by Kai Cheng Thom

- Front cover, with art by Samantha Garritano
- Author: Kai Cheng Thom
- Genre: Transgender fiction
- Publisher: Metonymy Press
- Publication date: 15 November 2016
- Pages: 200
- ISBN: 978-0-9940471-3-7

Fierce Femmes and Notorious Liars: A Dangerous Trans Girl's Confabulous Memoir is a 2016 Canadian book by Kai Cheng Thom. A surrealist novel, it follows an unnamed transgender woman protagonist who leaves home at a young age to live on the Street of Miracles—where various sex work takes place—with other "femmes" (trans women). After one of them is killed, others form a gang and begin to attack men on the street.

Thom aimed not to write a traditional transgender memoir targeted at explaining transgender issues to cisgender people, but to write the book that would have helped her as a transgender teenager. Characters are based on people from her life, as are plot points, but they are exaggerated and made surrealist. Two metaphors, those of killer bees living inside her and a Ghost Friend which can make her orgasm, represent after-effects of traumatic abuse.

The novel garnered critical praise and was a finalist for Transgender Fiction at the 29th Lambda Literary Awards. It experienced a resurgence of attention when Emma Watson chose it for her feminist book club, Our Shared Shelf, in 2019.

== Background ==
Kai Cheng Thom is a writer and poet. She came out as a transgender woman as a teenager. Fierce Femmes was her first published book and first long-form piece of fiction; she did not initially intend for it to be read by others, and aimed to write the book she would have most appreciated reading as a teenager. Thom began the novel shortly after a New York publisher rejected a book of her poetry, and wrote a chapter per day for ten days. After her publisher Metonymy Press asked if she was working on anything, Thom finished the book by writing late at night.

The author was inspired by Audre Lorde's biomythographies—books which mythologise the author's life. Thom stated that the "emotions and sensations" of the book "are all true", though the writing is surrealist. Some of the plot and most of the characters are based on Thom's life, but "heightened, surrealized and embroidered upon". She said that the "sort of real-life hero's journey" involved in transitioning suited "heightened narratives". The title is about how people "have to lie or use fiction in order to express the truth" about themselves, and was inspired by Blanche DuBois's line "Never inside, I didn't lie in my heart" in A Streetcar Named Desire. She said that it was not just for transgender women, but "any young person who longs for danger" or "to break out of the story they're stuck in".

According to Thom, Fierce Femmes was a response to the trope of transgender memoirs serving to "educate cis people about the reality of trans life". Instead of the "stereotypically tragic portrayal of trans women characters", the characters "dare to fight back, even when it takes them down some morally questionable paths", as this matched the people Thom knew in real life. As she had experienced a lot of street harassment, including physical violence, she wrote about "what it means to be afraid" and aimed to explore a subversion where transgender women become violent rather than victims. However, the book also follows the negative consequences of perpetrating violence. Two extended metaphors in the work—Ghost Friend and the killer bees—represent the "beautiful" and painful sides of trauma, respectively, according to Thom. Ghost Friend "allows her to connect with herself in particular ways", but prevents her from other kinds of intimacy, while the killer bees make her punish herself. Thom experienced physical and verbal abuse as a child, and said that she could infer that she was sexually abused from "the way the story is told to [her]".

In her writing, Thom wanted to present a hopeful perspective without erasing the difficulties transgender women face. As the protagonist is "constantly trying to escape a story that is told about her and not authored by her", Thom chose an ending to avert "every possible sanitized or restrictive ending", including a fairy-tale ending, happy ending or tragedy. It shows a situation in which the protagonist has "everything [they] wanted from a fairy-tale ending, and it still wasn't enough".

== Plot ==
Born to Chinese parents who emigrated to Gloom, the unnamed trans girl protagonist has had a cluster of killer bees inside her since she was aged six and they swarmed into her body. Since eleventh grade, she has experienced sexual pleasure via Ghost Friend, an ungendered being which brings her to orgasm when she consents. On the day that a clan of dead mermaids wash up on the beach, the protagonist decides to flee to the City of Smoke and Lights, leaving her younger sister Charity behind. Throughout the book, she sends letters to Charity, who begins misbehaving in her absence. She also writes chapters of "song of the pocket knife" in her notebook, detailing her self-harm as it subsides and reoccurs depending on her life situation.

Following the bus journey to the City of Smoke and Lights, a man assaults the protagonist in public so she attacks him with kung fu. She meets Kimaya, who takes her to Street of Miracles: there, trans women—or, "femmes"—engage in sex work for survival. Kimaya helps her find a barebones apartment to rent and introduces her to Dr. Crocodile, who gives her medication to grow breasts in exchange for sexual activity. She meets Rapunzelle, Kimaya's girlfriend. Rapunzelle was addicted to the drug Lost after suffering abuse by her father. One night, while on Lost, she started to shapeshift; Kimaya held onto her and she became herself again.

After Soraya becomes the latest femme to be murdered, Valaria the Goddess of War calls upon the women to form the Lipstick Lacerators. Though Kimaya and others object, the protagonist joins the gang as they attack the men on the Street of Miracles, with the exception of those who are sex workers, homeless or treat femmes well. They are the subject of headlines, and Ivana's injury at the hands of men who fight back sparks argument between Valaria and her ex-lover Lucretia. The Lipstick Lacerators are invited to a university, where the protagonist gives her number to a trans boy in the library. One night, they flee after their latest target turns out to be an undercover cop. As one police officer is about to shoot Lucretia, the protagonist grabs his baton and hits him in the head, killing him. No femme dies at the hands of police, despite the injuries, but Valaria must leave the city as the police are searching for her. This leaves the protagonist as leader.

She has a sexual nightmare about the cop she killed and begins self-harming again. Alzena the Witch tells her that she can only stop hurting others when she stops hurting herself. Kimaya arranges a night for femmes at the Cabaret Rouge so that they can perform just for themselves, not for men. After overhearing an argument between Kimaya and her now-ex Rapunzelle about the Lipstick Lacerators and her, the protagonist asks Alzena how to catch a swarm of bees and is told, "with sweetness". She spends a day baking a cake and the bees swarm out of her body. The boy from the library—Josh—calls her and they arrange a date. Kimaya is excited as Josh is known for his writing and community work about trans issues. In a cemetery, Josh kisses the protagonist, but she begins crying and recoils. Ghost Friend comforts her and she leaves them behind as she chooses to have sex with Josh. Six weeks later, she has moved into Josh's lavish apartment, but suddenly realises it is not where she belongs. She smashes his television, runs away and entrusts her pocket knife to Charity.

== Publication ==
The book was published on 15 November 2016 by the independent publisher Metonymy Press in Montreal, Canada. Samantha Garritano designed the original cover art. Metonymy Press's Ashley Fortier said that there was an expectation for transgender writers to "write all about gender" and the difficulty of being gender non-conforming, but that the book gives "a different narrative" on the author's "own terms". It was the bestseller in 2016 for the independent Canadian LGBT Glad Day Bookshop and ninth in the National Post's bestselling fiction list on 28 January 2017; it had reached its third printing by April 2017. In 2019, Zubaan Books published it in South Asia. The same year, Emma Watson chose the novel for her feminist book club Our Shared Shelf. Metonymy Press ordered a reprint of three times the number of copies that had been published to that point, and arranged a U.K. distributor. Metonymy Press averaged print orders of between 500 and 1,000 per book, but by 2019, Fierce Femmes had 10,000 copies printed.

== Reception ==
In 2017, the book was one of three finalists in the Transgender Fiction category at the 29th Lambda Literary Awards. When awarding Thom the 2017 Dayne Ogilvie Prize, the jurors said on behalf of the Writers' Trust of Canada that it was "a delicious and fabulist refashioning of a trans memoir as fiction". Emma Watson praised the book for conveying "the sense of creativity and invention that comes from becoming your own woman – an artist of your own identity".

Luna Merbruja of Autostraddle reviewed the novel as a "captivating tale of betrayal, murder, mysticism, legend and compassion", and wrote that it is "satirical commentary on the roots of trans literature as based in memoir". Merbruja found the characters "painfully realistic" and approved that the reader can "identify with more than one character who's canonically and unapologetically a trans woman". Writing in The Paris Review, Spencer Quong found that the book's "unremitting representation of anxiety" kept him thinking about it a year on from his first reading. He praised the poetry, quoting a "song of the pocket knife" extract as "perfectly articulat[ing] the feeling of overextending oneself". Quong found it overall "thrilling, fabulous" and "inventive", summarising that "anxiety and shame are ... straining and terrifying", but "markers of being alive".

Jacob Wren of the Montreal Review of Books praised that the novel reinvents trans memoir tropes "in fabulist Technicolor". Wren found that one of the "greatest strengths" was its "mile-a-minute engagement" with trans women, whom he viewed as the target audience, and also praised its unpredictability. He lauded the characterisation, finding "epigrammatic precision" in the complexity and motivations of characters and "emotional intensity" conveyed by short passages. Wren also enjoyed that the protagonist "rarely lies to herself", creating a "tension between fantasy and self-awareness". Gwen Benaway of Plenitude similarly extolled the diverse presentation of race, gender expression and social relationships between trans women. Benaway highlighted a sexual dream the protagonist has as "an insightful representation of the relationship between trans girls and cis men". Overall, Benaway summarised the book as a "profound exercise in imagining a better world for trans women while also reflecting the truth of our bodies as powerful, radiant, and whole".

Leah Lakshmi Piepzna-Samarasinha of Bitch said that the book is "full of poetic voice" and that many trans women of colour "will see their own stories reflected within". Describing it as about "the gritty struggle of making transformative justice real", she found it good that "trans femmes actually get to heal". She highlighted as particularly strong topics the origin of Kimaya and Rapunzelle's relationship, the metaphors of killer bees and Ghost Friend, the way in which femmes have a night to perform "just for each other" following police suppression, and the ending.

=== Influence ===
Valérie Bah was inspired by Fierce Femmes and Notorious Liars as they wrote The Rage Letters.
