= Agender =

Gender identity of lacking a gender

- Definition: Gender identity of the lack of gender
- Classification: Gender identity

Other terms
- Synonyms: Genderless, gender-free, non-gendered, ungendered
- Associated terms: Non-binary; Gender neutrality; Third gender; Genderfluid; Gender nonconforming

Flag
- Agender pride flag
- Flag name: Agender pride flag
- Meaning: Black and white represent the absence of gender; gray represents semi-genderlessness; green represents non-binary genders

Agender is a gender identity where an individual has no gender and does not necessarily follow gender roles. It can also be known as genderless, gender-free, non-gendered, or ungendered. Agender represents a variety of identities that differ from conventional gender norms. Identities that fall under the agender label include demiagender and gendervoid, among others. The A in LGBTQIA+ stands for agender, alongside asexual and aromantic.

The identity of agender people, like other queer identities, are not universally accepted, and agender people can face discrimination. The first person to be legally recognized as agender was recognized in Oregon in 2017. In 2025, Gender Census, a global survey of non-binary people, found that 25% of participants identified as agender.

== Identity ==
Agender people identify as having no gender. Agender people may choose to not follow traditional gender roles. Some agender people partially associate with other genders, while others reject gender entirely. The term agender also covers several related gender identities, including demiagender, similar ones such as neutrois, among others.

Some, although not all, agender people may consider themselves to be transgender. The 2015 United States Transgender Survey found 48.6% of agender participants identified as transgender. In that same survey, of people who selected agender, 36% also selected androgynous, 35.6% genderfluid, 52.6% genderqueer, 79.9% non-binary, and 51.4% trans.

There is no single set of pronouns used by all agender people, and agender people may choose any pronoun set. The most common used is singular they, with many agender people also accepting any pronouns.

Some agender people may experience "agender euphoria" when engaging in genderless spaces of activities. Safe spaces for gender euphoric experiences, including agender euphoria, can often be provided by video games.

== History ==
According to the Oxford English Dictionary, the first recorded use of the word was in 1996, as "A-gender", in an article in The Independent.

A 1997 paper in International Journal of Transgenderism states that "An individual of any genetic sex may also regard [themself] as [...] an ungendered person, who does not or will not identify with any conventional gender".

The first known use of the term "agender", without the hyphen, was on a Usenet forum referring to the gender of the Christian God. The Oxford English Dictionary points to usage of the word as far back as 2005 on the Usenet newsgroup "alt.politics.democrats":

Cultures can have transgender, agender, and hypergender individuals.

— Re: Homosexuality & Bible in alt.politics.democrats

A 2013 New York Times article talked about a non-binary person who used the term agender to describe themself.

"Agender" and "neutrois" were among the custom gender options added to Facebook in February 2014 and to OkCupid since November 2014.

In 2017, Judge Amy Holmes Hehn ruled that Patch, an agender resident of Portland, Oregon, could be legally identified as agender. The first Agender Pride Day was celebrated on May 19, 2017, to commemorate this, and is celebrated annually on that day.

In 2019 the literary magazine The Asexual rebranded itself to Aze, and began to publish content about agenderness and aromanticism, instead of only asexuality.

== Symbols ==
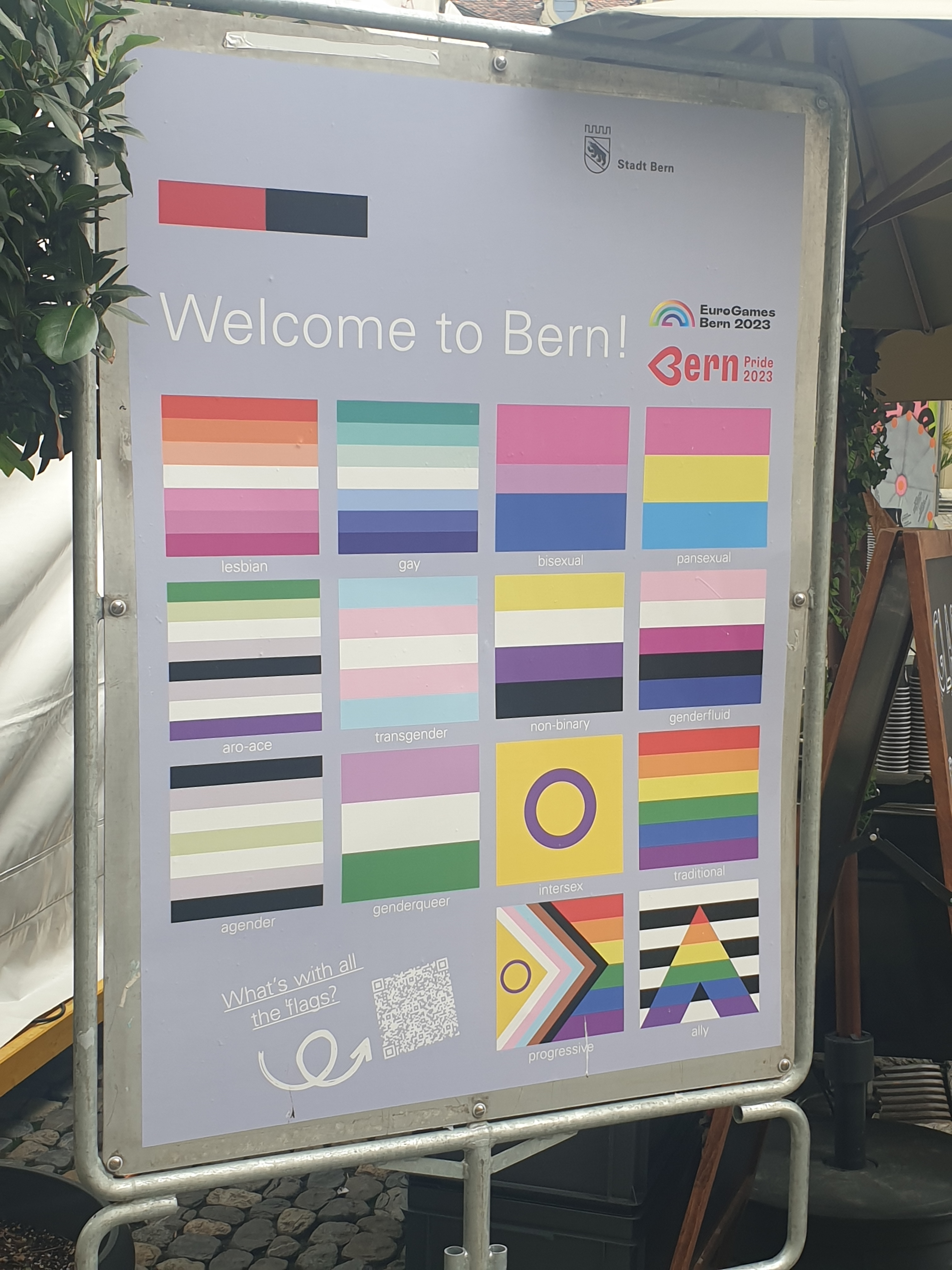
A display of the 2023 Bern Eurogames including the agender flag.

The agender flag was created in 2014 by Tumblr user Salom X. (Note: The same user created the demiboy and demigirl flags.) The black and white represent the absence of gender, the gray represents people who are semi-genderless and the green is for non-binary genders.

== Agender Pride Day ==
Agender Pride Day is an annual event celebrated on May 19 every year since 2017. It is dedicated to celebrating agender people and identity as well as raising awareness of issues and discrimination agender people face. It originally celebrated an Oregon resident being legally recognised as agender.

== Legal recognition ==
While numerous places allow people to be legally recognised as non-binary or belonging to a third gender on official documents, a Cambridge University study found a possible criticism of this system is that it excludes agender people by implying they identify with a third gender rather than no gender. The same study found there was still some optimism among agender people toward a third gender option.

In 2017, Patch became the first person in the United States to be legally recognised as agender after a ruling from Oregon judge Amy Holmes Hehn, the same judge who had been the first to legally recognise an American as non-binary the previous year.

In 2021, the Court of Justice of São Paulo allowed a non-binary applicant to be legally recognised as agender.

== Prevalence ==
In 2017, an analysis of gender identity surveys found that 14% of transgender participants identified as agender. In 2025, Gender Census, a global survey of 43,096 non-binary people, found that 25% of participants identified as agender.

=== Canada ===
In 2022, Canada became the first country to provide census data on non-binary people. The census found 5.1% of non-binary people aged over 15 in Canada, and 0.015% of the overall population, described themselves as agender.

=== United States ===
The 2015 United States Transgender Survey found 14.5% of participants identified as agender. People who selected agender had a median age of 23. 77.3% of people who selected agender in this survey were assigned female at birth.

== Related identities ==
Many identities overlap and there are some non-binary people who consider the agender experience to be a spectrum, encompassing other forms of expression. Some multigender people also identify with other genders, including agender, or are fluid between agender and another gender.

=== Apogender ===
Apogender, is defined as not only rejecting gender, but also feeling removed from the concept of gender entirely. Many apogender people also identify as gender-distanced. The term comes from the Greek prefix "apo", which means away or separate.

In 2025, Gender Census found that of 43,096 responses of non-binary people, 8 identified as Apogender.

=== Demiagender ===
Demiagender (Sometimes spelled demi-agender) is a subclass of demigender and agender identity in which someone feels a partial connection to one gender while also partially identifying with no gender.

In 2025, Gender Census found that, of 43,096 responses of non-binary people, 5 identified as demiagender or demi-agender.

Demiagender flag

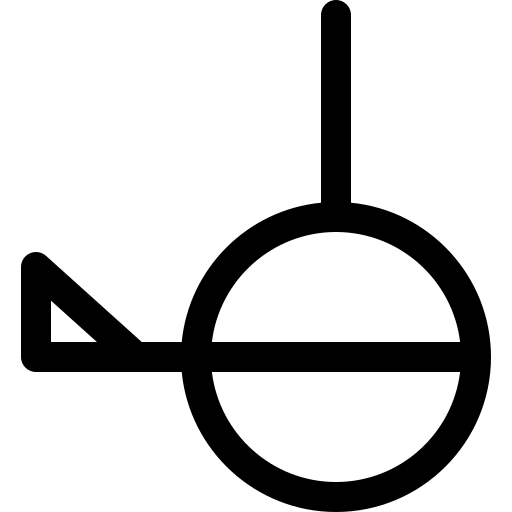
Demiagender symbol

=== Gendervoid ===
Gendervoid (also known as voidgender) can be described as being devoid of gender. It is often used as a synonym of agender, but is generally considered to be closer to a complete lack of gender experience or identity.

The terms first known appearance was on Tumblr in 2015.

In 2025, Gender Census found that, of 43,096 responses of non-binary people, 152 (0.4%) identified as gendervoid.

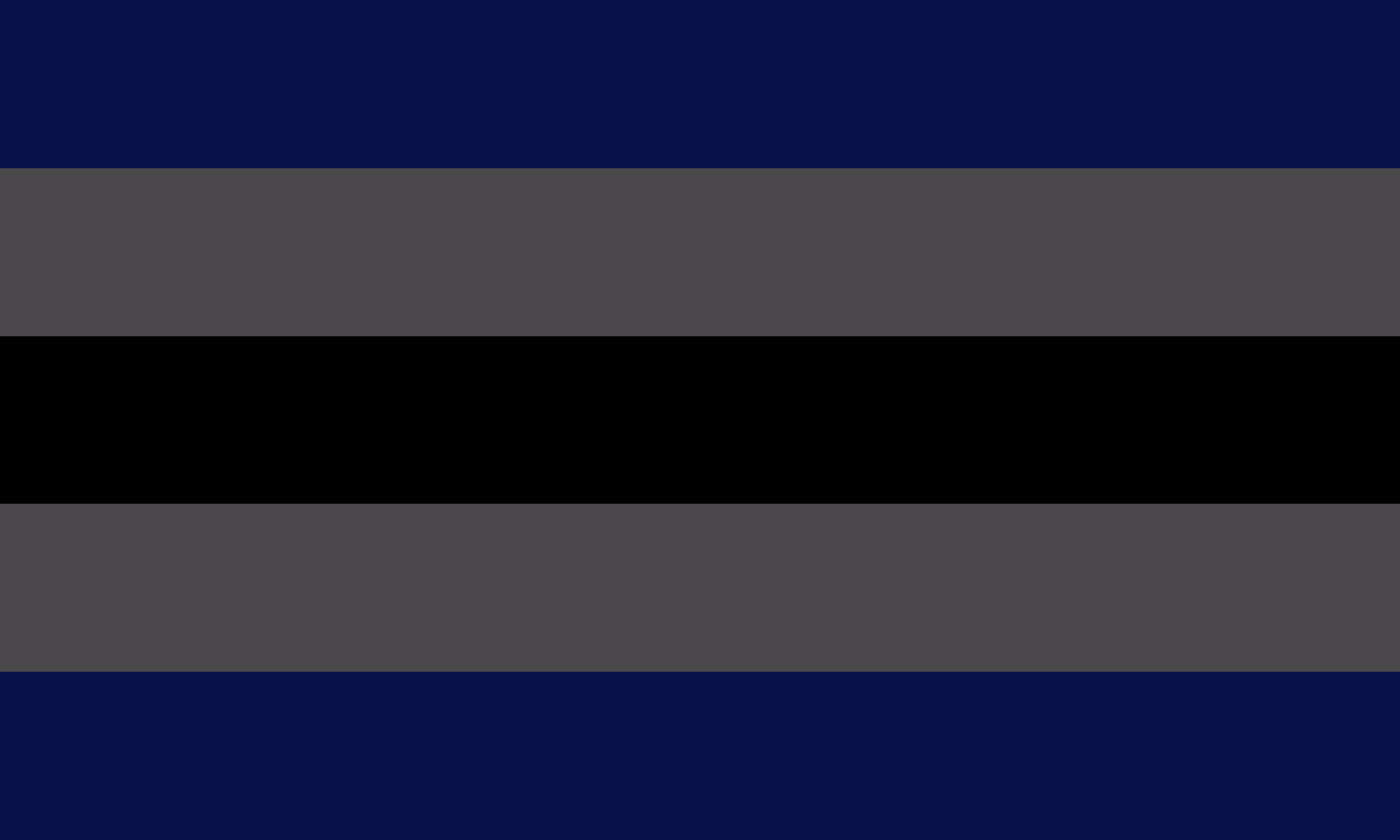
Gendervoid flag

=== Gender apathetic ===
Gender apathetic or apagender is a gender identity where an individual is indifferent, or apathetic, toward their own gender identity. Gender apathetic is considered an agender adjacent gender non-conforming identity separate from other identities. It can also be known as gender apathy, greygender, cassgender, inersgender, anvisgender, cis apathetic or trans apathetic.

Gender apathetic people are typically indifferent towards their own gender identity. Gender apathetic people may choose to identify with certain aspects of certain labels and genders, though not entirely, as no gender expression may fully capture their sense of self. They can use any pronouns, including neopronouns, their birth pronouns, or different pronouns interchangeably. They often feel indifferent to gendered comments.

In a 2026 paper, Katie Seaborn, Shano Liang, Rua Mae Williams and Phoebe O. Toups Dugas considered gender apathetic to be an "agender adjacent identity", alongside genderless, gender-free and non-binary. In 2022, Medical News Today and Gayety considered gender apathetic to be a type of non-binary identity, under the non-binary umbrella. Gender apathetic individuals may feel isolated from others as a result of their gender identity, and doubt their own understanding of their gender. The identity is often misunderstood, leading to judgement and misconceptions forming around it.

In 2025, Gender Census found that, of 43,096 responses of non-binary people, 248 (0.6%) identified as gender apathetic or one of its synonyms.

Gender apathetic flag

=== Neutrois ===
Neutrois is a gender identity closely related to agender, in which someone has a neutral gender. The term was coined by H.A. Burnham in 1995, and was most popular in the 2010s. Neutrois and agender overlap in meaning, with some people identifying as both, but neutrois is associated closer with expression and physical appearance.

The term is often (although not always) used by those who experience gender dysphoria and/or gender euphoria who may seek medical and/or social gender transitions to have a more neutral or androgynous appearance. Neutrois is believed to come from the French "neutre", meaning neutral, and "trois" meaning three. Neutrois was one of 50 genders added as options on Facebook in 2014.

In 2025, Gender Census found that, of 43,096 responses of non-binary people, 130 (0.3%) identified as Neutrois.

Neutrois flag

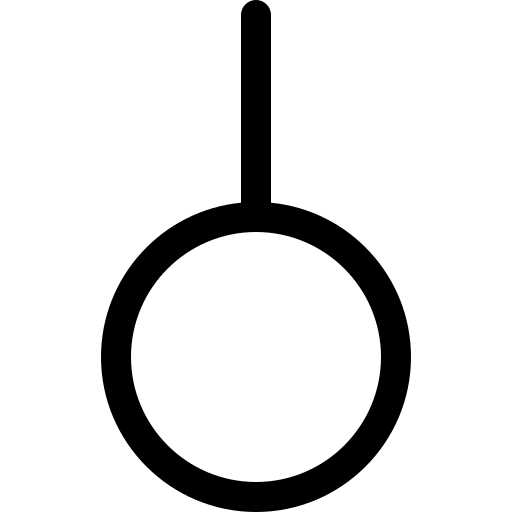
Neutrois symbol

== Notable agender people ==
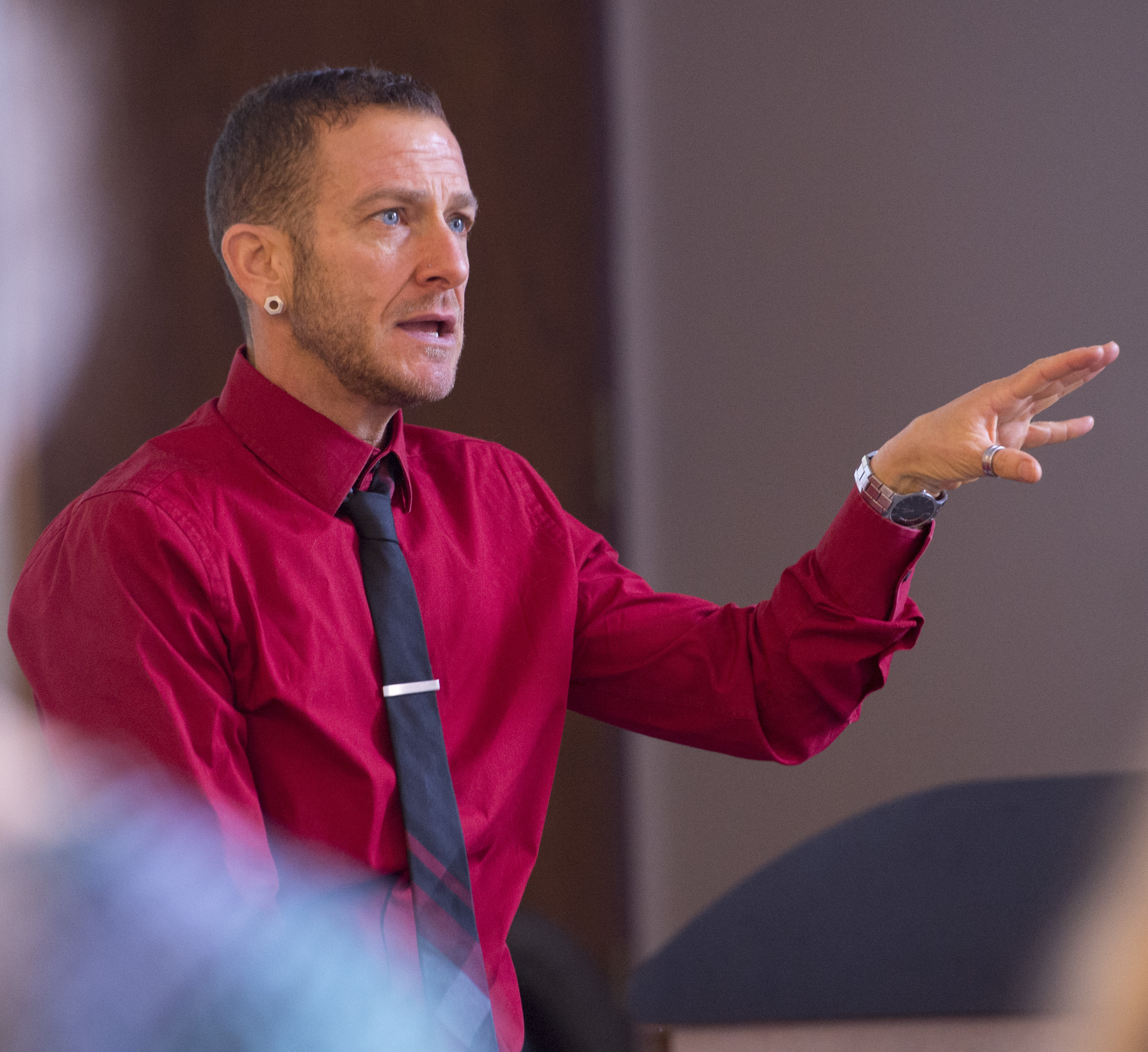
sj Miller, an agender American academic

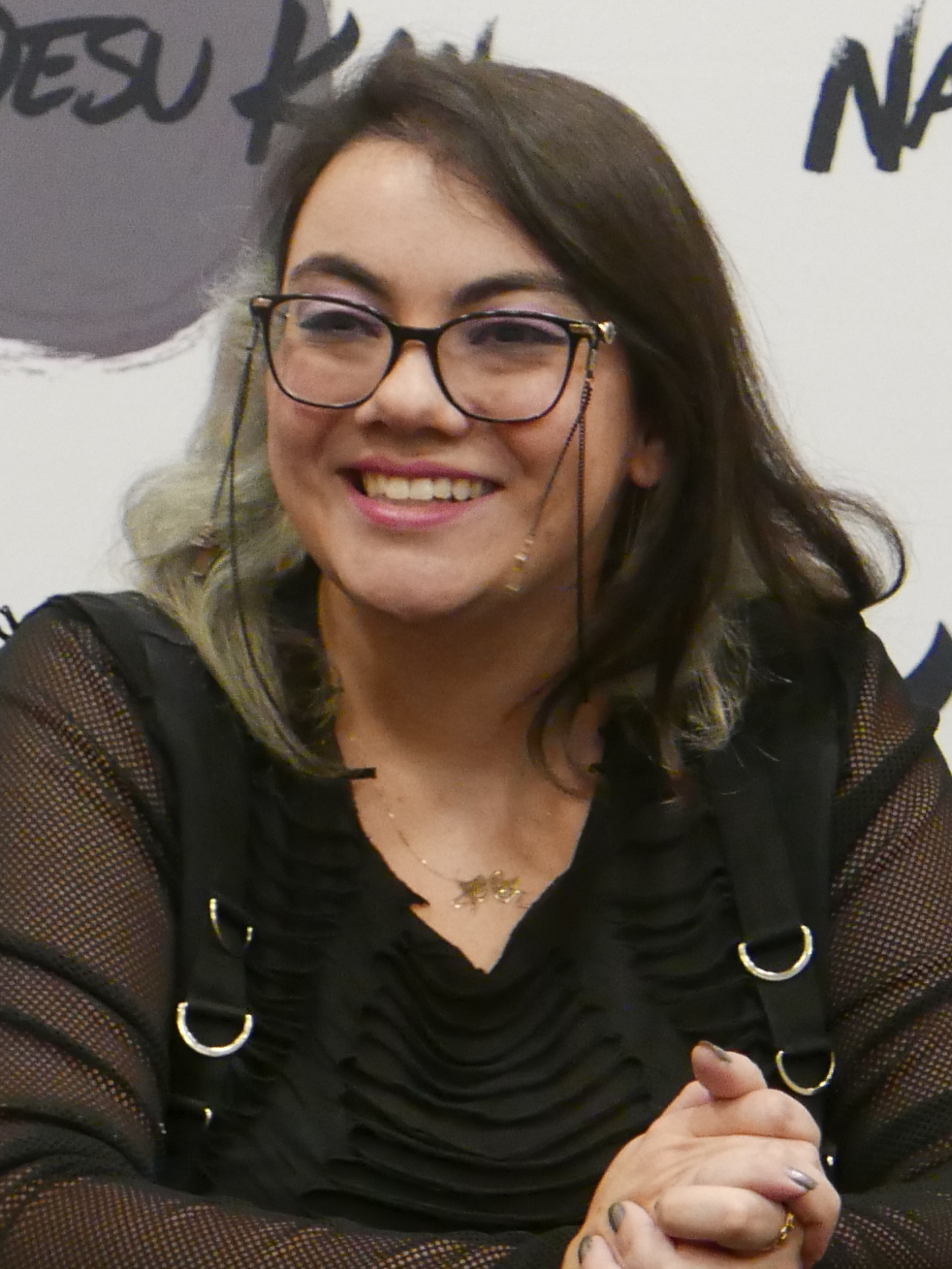
Marissa Lenti, an agender American voice actor

- Andre J., genderless American party promoter
- Angel Haze, American rapper and singer
- Bogi Takács, Hungarian writer
- Buhr, Brazilian singer
- Chanda Prescod-Weinstein, American theoretical cosmologist and particle physicist
- Cody Daigle-Orians, American author
- DeAnne Smith, Canadian and American comedy writer
- Em Essex, Canadian electronic musician and video game developer
- Jazmin Bean, English singer, songwriter, and makeup artist
- Lírio Negro, Brazilian activist
- Marissa Lenti, American voice actor
- Niecy Blues, American musical artist
- Owen Hurcum, former Mayor of Bangor, Wales; first openly non-binary, and youngest-ever, mayor in Wales
- Public Universal Friend, American preacher and founder of the Society of Universal Friends, who, after suffering a severe illness, claimed to have been reincarnated as a genderless evangelist
- sj Miller, American academic
- Tyler Ford, American writer and public speaker
- Veny, Japanese professional wrestler described as "genderless" and transgender, possibly due to translation issues

=== Fictional characters ===
- Biaggio from The Kings of Summer
- Testament from Guilty Gear
- The Knight from Hollow Knight
