= Niecy Blues =

- Born: Janise Robinson
- Genres: Gospel; R&B; experimental
- Labels: Kranky

Janise Robinson is an American singer who performs under the name Niecy Blues.

== Early life ==
Robinson was raised in a religious household in Oklahoma. They studied musical theater at Anderson University in South Carolina.

== Career ==
Robinson's debut EP, Opaque, was released in 2015. In 2020, they self-released a second EP, Cry.

Robinson released their full-length debut, Exit Simulation, through Kranky in November 2023. The release was named one of the 100 best albums of the year by The Quietus.

== Personal life ==
Robinson resides in Charleston, South Carolina. They identify as agender and use they/them and she/her pronouns.

== Discography ==
=== Albums ===
List of albums, with selected details
Title	Details
Exit Simulation	Released: November 10, 2023; Label: Kranky; Format: Digital download, vinyl, CD

=== Extended plays ===
List of extended plays, with selected details
Title	Details
Opaque	Released: 2015; Format: Digital download
CRY	Released: April 22, 2020; Format: Digital download

=== Singles ===
List of singles as lead artist, showing year released and album name
Title	Year	Album
"Bones Become the Trees"	2021	Non-album single
"Violently Rooted"	2023	Exit Simulation
