= Kama La Mackerel =

Mauritian-Canadian multidisciplinary artist, activist, translator, and community organizer

Kama La Mackerel is a Mauritian-Canadian multidisciplinary artist, activist, translator, and community organizer who resides in Montreal, Quebec. Their artistic practice moves between theatre, dance, spoken word and written poetry, watercolours, photography, performance, sculpture and installation. Working across multiple disciplines, La Mackerel's work explores their identity as a trans femme of colour who reaches back beyond the immediate constraints of the colonial circumstances of their life to the spiritual ancestral lineages of queer femmes.

== Early life and education ==
La Mackerel was born in Pamplemousses, Mauritius where they grew up in a Hindu and Catholic family. The first of their family to attend university, at the age of eighteen, they moved to India to pursue a Bachelor in Literature and Cultural Studies at the University of Pune, India. While in India they also studied and trained in contemporary dance and Kathak, the latter under the mentorship of Nandkishore Kapote. In 2008 they immigrated to Canada where they completed a Master's degree in Theory, Culture and Politics at Trent University in Peterborough, Ontario. In 2011 they moved to Montreal, where they actively began to pursue their artistic interests.

== Community Organizing ==
La Mackerel's experience of not finding queer community spaces that were hospitable to trans people of colour, led them to create community events and spaces that center 2SLGBTQ+ people.

=== Gender B(l)ender (2013-2018) ===
In 2013, responding to the lack of queer-friendly open mic spaces in Montreal, La Mackerel founded Gender B(l)ender, a monthly open mic/cabaret event held on the last Friday of every month. Venues included at Café l’Artère and librairie L’Euguélionne. Over a 5 year period La Mackerel organized and hosted 40 editions of the event which saw over 600 performances. Performers included Asher Lionheart, Iyan Hayadi, Jespa Jacob Smith, Roxane Nadeau, Kim Ninkuru, Tranna Wintour, Valérie Bah and Kai Cheng Thom.

=== Self-Love Cabaret: L'Amour se conjugue à la première personne (2012–2016) ===
Running for four years between 2012 and 2016, the Self-Love Cabaret was an anti-valentine, artistic event which sought to challenge the dominant, heteronormative and consumerist holiday of coupledom: Valentine's Day by showcasing creative expressions of self-love.

=== Contemporary Poetics of Trans Women of Colour Artists (2018) ===
Curated and facilitated by La Mackerel, this event brought together six trans women of colour artists: Arielle Twist, Kai Cheng Thom, Kim Ninkuru, Adri Almeida, Gwen Benaway and La Mackerel.

=== Speak B(l)ack: A Black History Month spoken word show and open mic (2017-2019) ===
Part of McGill University's Black History Month events, Speak B(l)ack was hosted by La Mackerel and saw performers such as Stephanie Lawrence, Kim Ninkuru, and Shanice Nicole.

== Interdisciplinary Arts Practice ==
While La Mackerel is most known for their debut poetry collection ZOM-FAM, their creative practice moves between dance, theatre, photography, sculpture, textiles, digital arts and video. La Mackerel is a self-taught artist and their practice emerges from a need to survive and find methods for navigating patriarchal colonial violence, and DIY grassroots cultural practices like zine-making, YouTube tutorials, open mic nights. Major projects include From Thick Skin to Femme Armour, Breaking the Promise of Tropical Emptiness, 'Race' is a Drag!, My Body is the Ocean, Bois d'Ébène.

=== 'RACE' IS A DRAG! (2012) ===
Through a series of impromptu public performances, during the summer of 2012, La Mackerel produced 'Race' is a Drag! - a series of photographs that document the artist through their process of reclaiming public space. Most notable is the way the photographs capture the reactions of passersby whose gaze carries heterosexist and racist microaggressions trans women regularly experience.

=== From Thick Skin to Femme Armour (2016) ===
From Thick Skin to Femme Armour is an extended multidisciplinary research art project which honours trans women and femme of colour resistance and resilience. The project was toured in Europe in 2016 as a spoken word solo show. The project involves watercolours, textiles with text, photographs, video and a series of wearable objects.

=== Breaking the Promise of Tropical Emptiness: Trans subjectivity in the Mauritian postcard ===
In this series of fifteen photographs, taken by South-African writer and scholar Nedine Moonsamy, La Mackerel challenges the way postcards contribute to colonial framing of tropical spaces as empty lands to colonize. The artist poses their body against scenic Mauritian vistas, reinscribing their trans body onto their native island.

=== ZOM-FAM ===
In 2020 La Mackerel published their debut poetry collection ZOM-FAM with Metonymy Press to wide acclaim. The title is a Mauritian Kreol term denoting "man-woman." The work consists of eight poems which were originally composed as spoken word pieces that eventually became the material of a solo stage performance. The decision to move from spoken word to theatrical stage performance was prompted by a desire to create more texture in the work through movement, ritual and embodiment. As the poems migrated from stage to page, La Mackerel carried the stage movement over into the written poetry by using the page as a stage and allowing the words to break with traditional poem stanzas and envisioning the words as the body and the page as the stage. Written in Canada, the poems explore the artist's experience of growing up on the island of Mauritius, in particular their relationship to land, water, family, language, and gender within, and in resistance to, the ideological and material framing of the island's colonial history. While written primarily in English, the poems pay tribute to the ancestral languages of the island, using Kreol and Mauritian colloquialisms which grow from the interrelations of English, Kreol, French, Bhopuri, Tamil, Hindi. The island and the ocean are situated at the heart of the work and lay the foundation for La Mackerel's poetic excavation of ancestral femme lineages connecting them to their femme spirituality. In the summer of 2021 the book was launched in Mauritius and is hailed as the first published work of queer Mauritian literature. The cover art of the book was made by Aun Li and Kai Yun Ching.

== Translation ==
La Mackerel has focused their translation on works by Canadian Anglophone trans women writers. Titles they have translated include Vivek Shraya's I'm Afraid of Men (J'ai peur des hommes) and Kai Cheng Thom's From the Stars in the Sky to the Fish in the Sea (L'enfant de fourrure, de plumes, d'écailles, de feuilles et de paillettes) and Fierce Femmes and Notorious Liars: A Dangerous Trans Girl's Confabulous Memoir (Fèms magnifiques et dangereuses: Mémoires affabulées d'une fille trans).

The Rage Letters, their 2023 translation of Valérie Bah's short story collection Les Enragé.e.s, was shortlisted for the 2024 Lambda Literary Award for Transgender Fiction.

== Awards ==
La Mackerel is a recipient of a Canada Council for the Arts Joseph S. Stauffer prize for emerging artists and was shortlisted as a finalist for the Dayne Ogilvie Prize for LGBTQ Canadian writers in 2021.
