= Being Ace =

2023 anthology edited by Madeline Dyer

- Editor: Madeline Dyer
- Genre: Anthology; LGBTQ literature; Varied
- Publisher: Page Street Kids
- Publication date: October 10, 2023
- ISBN: 978-1645679561
- Followed by: Being Aro

Being Ace: An Anthology of Queer, Trans, Femme, and Disabled Stories of Asexual Love and Connection is a 2023 short story anthology edited by Madeline Dyer. It features fourteen stories with asexual protagonists.

== Stories ==
- "How to Love a Sidewinder" by Kat Yuen
- "Across the Stars" by Akemi Dawn Bowman
- "Well Suited" by Rosiee Thor
- "Nylon Bed Socks" by Madeline Dyer
- "Give up the Ghost" by Linsey Miller
- "No Such Thing As Just" by K. Hart
- "Smells Like Teen Virgin" by S.E. Anderson
- "Sealights" by Emily Victoria
- "Moonspirited" by Anju Imura
- "The Third Star" by RoAnna Sylver
- "The Mermaid’s Sister" by Moniza Hossain
- "The Hazards of Pressing Play" by Lara Ameen
- "No Cure for Doubt" by Jas Brown
- "The Witch of Fest Falls" by S. J. Taylor

The book includes an introduction by Cody Daigle-Orians.

== Reception ==
Kirkus Reviews was mixed on the collection as a whole, stating that "some [stories] are immensely satisfying, others feel noticeably underdeveloped and rushed," but positively noted the diverse representation in the book, commenting on the depictions of asexual characters with varying racial backgrounds, disabilities, and intersectional LGBTQ identities, including several aromantic characters. They concluded that "asexual readers hungry for representation will find some outstanding pieces to dig into."

The book received a starred review from Alec Chunn of School Library Journal, who said the anthology's "narratives are ultimately affirming even when situations are difficult" and gave particular attention to the presence of a character who uses a power wheelchair.

Being Ace was a finalist for the 2024 Lambda Literary Award for Anthology at the 36th Lambda Literary Awards.

== Sequel ==
In 2026, a follow-up focused on aromanticism titled Being Aro: A Collection of Aromantic Fiction about Love, Connection, and Empowerment was published, edited by Dyer and Rosiee Thor.
