= Cody Daigle-Orians =

American author and social media personality

Cody Daigle-Orians is an American author and social media personality using the name, Ace Dad Advice.

== Career ==
Daigle-Orians previously worked as a company playwright. Daigle-Orians' first published work was a play, which was produced during their sophomore year of college. They have written several other plays.

In 2017, Daigle-Orians started a podcast, "Bearded Fruit", in which they discussed politics and queer culture. In 2021, they started "Ace Dad Advice", which is a TikTok account that provides users with advice about asexuality through the lens of a parental figure.

== Personal life ==
Daigle-Orians grew up in Lafayette, Louisiana. Daigle-Orians is non-binary (specifically agender) and uses both they/them and he/him pronouns. (Note: For consistency, they/them are used to refer to Daigle-Orians throughout this article.) Daigle-Orians came out as gay in 1994. They identified as asexual in their 40s, after learning about the label on Tumblr in the late 2010s. They are polyamorous.

== Awards ==
- I Am Ace: Advice on Living Your Best Ace Life, nominated for a British LGBT Awards in the Online Influencer category.
- Being Ace: An Anthology of Queer, Trans, Femme, and Disabled Stories of Asexual Love and Connection, was a finalist for Best LGBTQ Anthology in the 36th Lambda Literary Awards.

== Publications ==
=== Books ===
- Daigle-Orians, Cody (2023). I Am Ace: Advice on Living Your Best Ace Life. Jessica Kingsley Publishers. ISBN 9781839972621.
- Madeline Dyer, Cody Daigle-Orians, Linsey Miller, Rosiee Thor, Moniza Hossain, et al. Being Ace: An Anthology of Queer, Trans, Femme, and Disabled Stories of Asexual Love and Connection. (Page Street YA, 2023)
