= Marshall Blount =

American activist (born 1993)

Marshall J. Blount
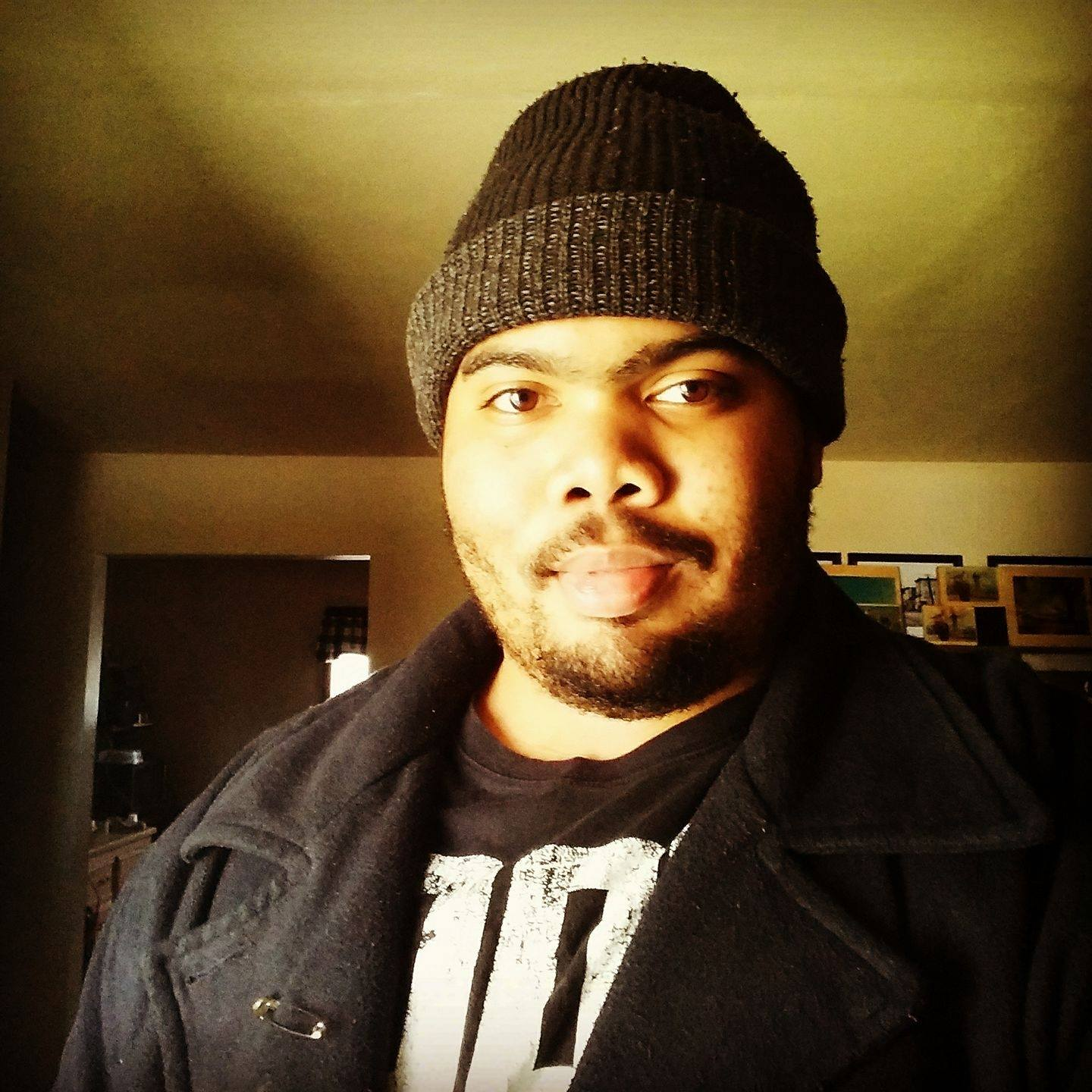
- Marshall in 2017
- Born: Marshall John Blount; February 16, 1993 (age 33); Erie, Pennsylvania
- Other name: Gentle Giant Ace
- Occupation: Activist/Photographer
- Years active: since 2013
- Known for: Asexual activism/Photography
- Notable work: Obtaining a proclamation for Ace Week 2020 from the Commonwealth of Pennsylvania

Marshall John Blount (born February 16, 1993) is an American asexual activist. Blount is also known as the "Gentle Giant Ace" in the asexual community.

== Activism ==
Blount became involved in asexual activism after negative reactions to his asexuality. He became a board member for Asexual Outreach, a non-profit organization, on May 3, 2020. He was involved with Erie's LGBTQ council until June 2020, when he resigned in protest due to the mayor's negative response to a local protest for George Floyd. Blount later joined the Pennsylvania commission on LGBTQ affairs to continue his work on a government level.

== Personal life ==
Blount, who is of African American descent, is from Erie, Pennsylvania, and graduated from high school while being homeschooled in 2011. He was part of a youth bowling league at Eastway Lanes from 2006 to 2014. At age 23, in 2016, Blount came out as asexual to his family and friends. Blount runs a YouTube channel where he regularly posts about asexuality and his experiences through society as someone who is openly asexual.

== Awards ==
In 2020, Blount helped obtain a proclamation for "Ace Week" throughout the Commonwealth of Pennsylvania. In 2013, He was nominated for Erie's 40 under 40 by The Erie Reader for his work in photography.
