= Lírio Negro =

Brazilian activist (born 1979)

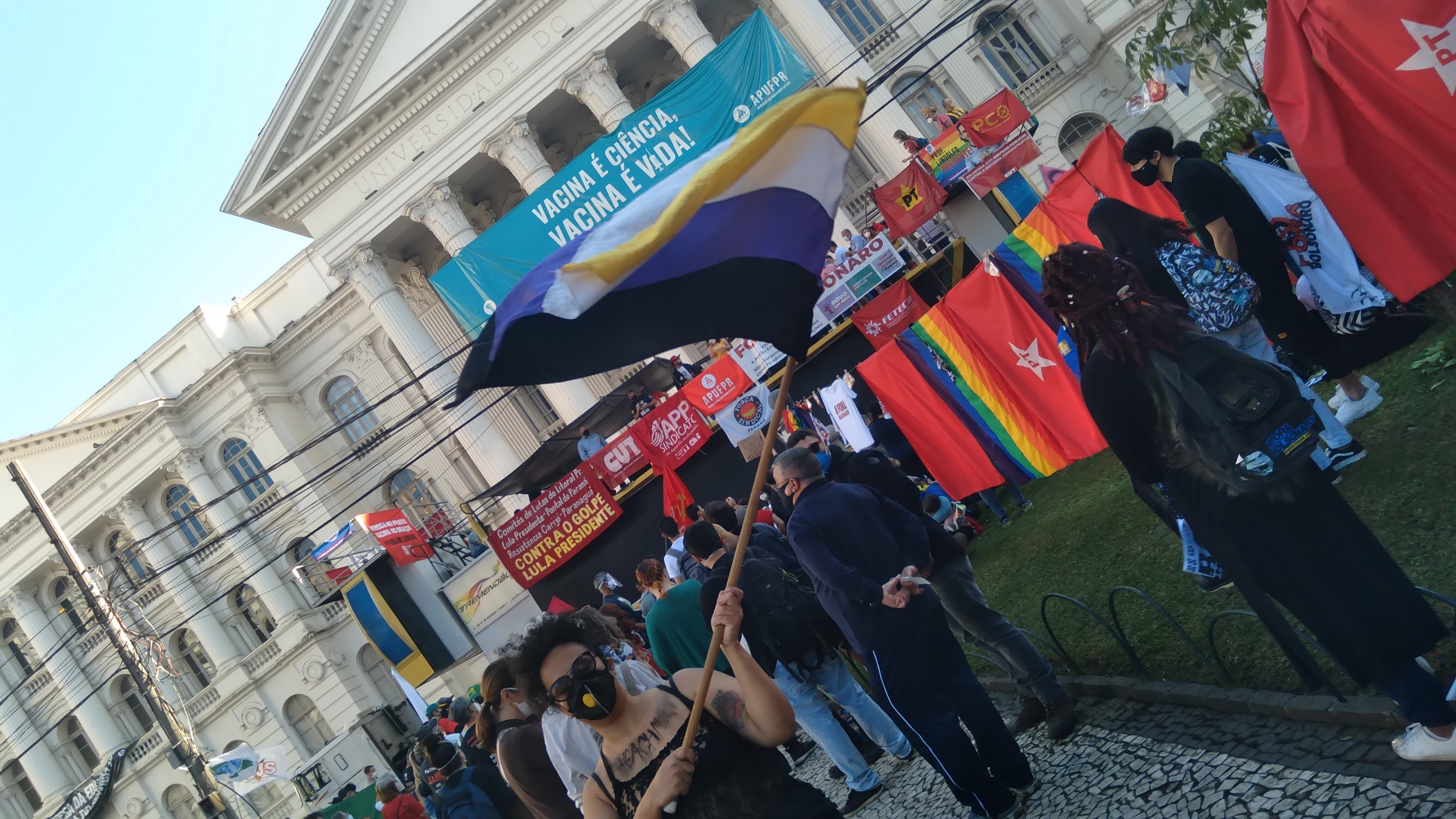
- Born: 23 March 1979; Maceió, Alagoas, Brazil
- Occupations: activist, artist, activist for the rights of people with disabilities, visual artist
- Known for: LGBT movement, Marijuana march, LGBT anarchism

Lírio Barbosa dos Santos (b. 23 March 1979), whose artistic name is Lírio Negro, is a Brazilian activist and artist.

== Biography ==
Born in Maceió, Lírio began their artistic activity in childhood, using elements of fashion design, costume, sculpture, sustainable art, and installation. They made their professional debut in 2009, when they opened their own studio in the Farol neighborhood, using performance as a complementary tool to their work.

Lírio fights against violence against LGBTQ people, ableism, sanism, and racism. Lírio identifies as an artivist who is genderless, within the non-binary gender spectrum, pansexual, demisexual, and queer anarchist. Lírio is autistic and lives with psoriasis and fibromyalgia. Lírio is an activist for anti-asylum and anti-prohibitionist struggles, part of the National Articulation of Marijuana Marches, supported by the SEMEAR Association, former member of GRIT from ILGA Portugal and the Latin American Non-Binary Network, and former deputy national coordinator of IBRAT - Brazilian Institute of Transmasculinities.

The first non-binary activist to engage in dialogue with the government in the state of Alagoas. Founder of the Coletivo Pró LGBT O “Quê” do Movimento Visibilidade TQIAPNB+. Curator, fashion designer, and speaker. Through "artivism" they create/build spaces for dialogue and social inclusion, as well as network articulation, on dissident identities and harm reduction in the mental health of the LGBTI+ population, with a specific focus on the transgender and non-binary population. They develop socio-informative/educational materials on the pro-LGBTI+ population and dissemination. Participated in all editions of the Human Rights Arts Exhibition of the State Secretariat for Women and Human Rights – SEMUDH. They held solo exhibitions in 2017, 2018, and 2019 based on experience reports focused on gender-based violence, non-binary identities, as well as dysphoria and suicide among LGBTI+ people.

They participated in the district and state stages of the 9th Health Conference in Alagoas in 2019; held the 1st Genderqueer and Non-Binary Pride Encounter and Celebration in Alagoas in partnership with SEMUDH and with support from collectives from São Paulo, Curitiba, and Maceió (in reference to the non-binary visibility day). During the activities of the 10th Pride Parade in Santa Luzia do Norte, roundtables on LGBTI+ mental health were held in the quilombola community. They participated in the district stages of Santa Luzia do Norte, Maceió, São José da Lage and in the state stage of the IV Conference on Human Rights and Public Policies for LGBT+, with a delegation to the National Free Conference, scheduled for May 2020. They participated in the International Congress of the LGBTI+ Alliance as a speaker in November 2019, in Curitiba, Paraná. In January 2020 they took part in the general coordination of the 1st Trans Visibility Act of Maceió, carried out by the Maceió Gay Group – GGM and partners. They are the 1st Deputy Coordinator of the National LGBTI Alliance in the State of Alagoas. In April 2020 the Non-Binary Area within the Alliance was created, Lírio was the main coordinator, conducting live streams to celebrate the week before the International Non-Binary People's Day.
