= Valérie Bah =

Canadian writer

Valérie Bah is a Canadian writer from Montreal, Quebec, who won the Amazon.ca First Novel Award in 2025 for her debut novel Subterrane. The book was published by Véhicule Press in 2024.

In 2020, Bah and Tatiana Zinga Botao collaborated on Sol, a short documentary about the impact of the COVID-19 pandemic on Black Canadian women, as part of the National Film Board of Canada's The Curve film series.

She published the French-language short story collection Les Enragé.e.s in 2021. The Rage Letters, an English translation by Kama La Mackerel, was published by Metonymy Press in 2023, and received a Lambda Literary Award nomination for Transgender Literature at the 36th Lambda Literary Awards in 2024.
