= Kai Cheng Thom =

Canadian writer and social worker

Kai Cheng Thom (born March 12, 1991) is a Chinese-Canadian writer, performance artist, mental health community worker, youth counsellor, and former social worker. Thom, a transgender woman, has published five books, including the novel Fierce Femmes and Notorious Liars: A Dangerous Trans Girl's Confabulous Memoir (2016), the poetry collection a place called No Homeland (2017), a children's book, From the Stars in The Sky to the Fish in the Sea (2017), I Hope We Choose Love: A Trans Girl's Notes from the End of the World (2019), a book of essays centered on transformative justice, and Falling Back in Love With Being Human: Letters to Lost Souls (2023).

== Career ==
=== Writing ===
Thom's first book, Fierce Femmes and Notorious Liars, was published by Metonymy Press in 2016. It was shortlisted for the Lambda Literary Award for Transgender Fiction at the 29th Lambda Literary Awards, and the year after it was published Thom won the 2017 Dayne Ogilvie Prize for LGBTQ Emerging writers. The Dayne Ogilvie jury, consisting of writers Jane Eaton Hamilton, Elio Iannacci and Trish Salah, cited Thom's work as "sheer joyful exuberance, creativity, and talent", calling Fierce Femmes "a delicious and fabulist refashioning of a trans memoir as fiction" and "a genre-breaking refusal of the idea that the only stories trans people have to tell are their autobiographies." In 2019, Fierce Femmes and Notorious Liars was chosen by Emma Watson for her online feminist book club Our Shared Shelf.

Thom's debut children's picture book, From the Stars in the Sky to the Fish in the Sea was published in 2017 by Arsenal Pulp Press. In 2020, From the Stars in the Sky to the Fish in the Sea was selected by Julie Andrews for inclusion in her Julie's Library podcast.

In 2018, Arsenal Pulp Press published Thom's debut poetry collection a place called No Homeland. The book was an American Library Association Stonewall Honor Book in 2018, and was a shortlisted finalist for the Publishing Triangle Award for Trans and Gender-Variant Literature. Room Magazine called the book a "vulnerable, shimmering debut." Further in the Room Magazine review, the reviewer Adele Barclay writes "Many of Thom's poems deploy this bold, storytelling voice, foregrounding the wisdom of what is said, experienced, lived, rumoured, and gossiped in lieu of traditional history with its myopia of normativity. a place called No Homeland consistently examines the collisions that marginalized identities encounter. And through this, Thom finds, 'there is a poem waiting deep below.'" One of the poems in a place called No Homeland, "we did not ask for", is featured in Vancouver is Awesome's Poetic License series.

In 2019, Thom published her non-fiction debut, I Hope We Choose Love: A Trans Girl's Notes from the End of the World. It was a 2020 American Library Association Stonewall Honor Book, and won the Publishing Triangle Award for Trans and Gender-Variant Literature.

In 2023 Penguin Random House Canada published Thom's most recent book, Falling Back in Love With Being Human: Letters to Lost Souls. The book was shortlisted for a Pat Lowther Memorial Award in 2024. Shondaland writer Sarah Neilson describes the book as “a collection of lyrical love poems dedicated to runaways, liars, compulsive caregivers, and even J.K. Rowling.” Neilson adds, “The book also includes interludes where [Thom] offers a prompt for self-reflection or a ritual.”

In 2025, Thom published "Straining Toward Humanity" as part of the anthology Both/And: Essays by Trans and Gender-Nonconforming Writers of Color. The work, edited by Denne Michele Norris with Electric Literature, became a finalist for the 2026 Lambda Literary Award for Transgender Nonfiction.

Currently, Thom writes a column called Dangerous Space for Xtra Magazine, where she explores current "hot-button" issues related to the LGBTQ community. Prior to Dangerous Space, Thom wrote a column for Xtra called Ask Kai: Advice for the Apocalypse, which ran from 2019 until 2023.

Thom has written for Everyday Feminism, BuzzFeed, Autostraddle, Asian American Literary Review, Guts Magazine, Plenitude, and xoJane.

In addition to her formally-published writing, Thom freely shares her experience and education via infographics, poetry, and long-form writing on her social media (X, Substack, Instagram).

==== Monsters ====
In addition to Monster Academy, weaved through Thom's past and current work and interviews exists the theme of monsters. In Falling Back in Love With Being Human, for example, Thom dedicates the book to "all the monsters still waiting to be loved". In one of the letters to "The Ones Whose Bodies Shall Shake the Heavens", Thom writes "Dear trans women, the only way to live as a being cast as irrevocably monstrous is to embrace a monster's power, the power to inspire awe, horror, unbidden desire. A monster is a creature made of the truth no one else dares to speak. A monster is a being beyond fear." Thom is also quoted saying, " I love monsters because they represent the hungriest, most hidden parts of ourselves that we most often confine to exile. If I can love a monster, if someone can love the monster in me, then anyone is capable of loving and being loved."

=== Social work ===
Thom worked in the public sector in Toronto as a mental health clinician for transgender youth and families for four years. During this time, Thom co-founded Monster Academy: Mental Health Skills for Montreal Youth, a program that provided resources and workshops to youth aged 16–25.

Thom contributed to a peer-reviewed paper in Transgender Health titled Guidance and Ethical Considerations for Undertaking Transgender Health Research and Institutional Review Boards Adjudicating this Research, a set of guidelines developed with the purpose of "creat[ing] a set of provisional criteria for Institutional Review Boards (IRBs) to refer to when assessing the ethical orientation of transgender health research proposals".

=== Loving Justice Framework ===
Kai Cheng Thom created the Loving Justice Framework, "a trauma-informed model of conflict resolution rooted in Transformative Justice and prison abolition" In partnership with Project NIA, Thom helped to create an Abolitionist Toolbox featuring abolition-focused graphic designs called Radical Roadmaps.

== Education and background ==
Thom has a Master of Social Work and a Master of Science (Applied) in Couples and Family Therapy, both from McGill School of Social Work. Thom is a certified Somatic Sex Educator and works as an adjunct faculty member at the Institute for the Study of Somatic Sex Education.

Thom grew up in Vancouver but her parents' roots are in the Guangdong province of China. She speaks Cantonese.
