= Andre J. =

American party promoter

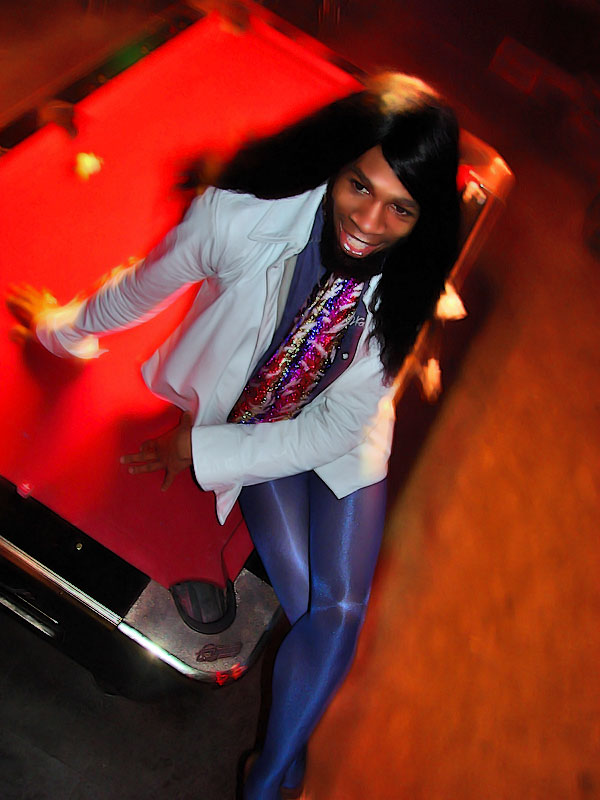
- Andre J. at Dick's Bar in the East Village, March 2007
- Born: Andre Johnson; October 16, 1969 (age 57); Newark, New Jersey, United States
- Occupation: Party promoter
- Known for: Androgynous personal style

Andre J. (born 1969) is an American party promoter in the New York City fashion scene. They are known for their androgynous personal style and have been featured in photo spreads in French Vogue and V magazine.

== Biography ==
Born Andre Johnson in Newark, New Jersey, Andre J. was raised by a single mother in a housing project called Academy Spires.

For several years in the early 2000s, they lived in Los Angeles, California. During those years, they worked at a boutique on Melrose Avenue and made three brief appearances on segments of The Tonight Show with Jay Leno "devoted to human curiosities". They typically wore a fur hat, a beige fishnet shirt with holes, and jeans so low that they revealed their pubic hair, though they changed before leaving for fear of being mistaken for a transgender prostitute on their way home to the $60-a-night Sunset Strip hotel in which they lived.

Andre J. later moved to New York City "for the liberation, the freedom, the action" and worked as a perfume salesperson at Lord & Taylor, as a publicist for Patricia Field's boutique, and as a party host for the clubs Lotus and Hiro. While on the street one day in summer 2007, they were spotted by stylist Joe McKenna, who was then on the phone with fashion photographer Bruce Weber. With McKenna's encouragement, Weber decided to shoot Andre J. for French Vogue, and Carine Roitfeld, the magazine's editor, deemed Andre J.'s photos the freshest of all Weber's images. Roitfeld put a photo of the bearded Andre J., dressed in a women’s blue neoprene Burberry trench coat, ankle boots, and a cocktail ring, on the cover of her magazine. "There is not a special message in the cover, I just loved it," she said later.

== Personal style ==
Though Andre J. often wears feminine clothing, they do not consider themself a crossdresser. Rather, they see themself as unconfined by gender and social conventions. "Most people are conditioned to think of a black man looking a certain way," they told The New York Times. "They only think of the ethnic man in XXX jeans and Timberlands, and here Andre J. comes along with a pair of hot shorts and a caftan or maybe flip-flops or cowboy boots or a high, high heel." Andre J.'s style inspirations have included Cher and model Donyale Luna. They describe their aesthetic as a "60s, not mod, but mod-ish, and hippie look" that is also influenced by the style of 1970s blaxploitation films.

Called a "cheerful muse" by New York Magazine, Andre J. says their positive outlook on life has influenced their style: "I want people to look at me and feel inspired, to feel hope, to smile. I want to surge positive energy in your body, confirm that you too can be yourself." They said they have been affirmed by strangers telling them that they were glad they are alive, and believe that they were put on the earth "to be a bodhisattva, to just glow, emanate love, respect, peace, pizzazz".
