= Free From Desire =

Podcast on aromanticism and asexuality

- Genre: Society & Culture
- Country of origin: United States, France
- Language: English

Creative team
- Developed by: Paradiso Media
- Written by: Aline Laurent-Mayard

Cast and voices
- Narrated by: Aline Laurent-Mayard

Production
- Production: Suzanne Colin; Yael Even Or
- Length: 16–28 minutes

Publication
- No. of episodes: 5
- Original release: 7 June 2023
- Updates: Weekly on Wednesday

Reception
- Cited for: Narrative Nonfiction Audio Storytelling Award; 2023 Tribeca Festival

Related
- Website: Official Website

Free From Desire is a biographical narrative documentary podcast that focuses on aromanticism and asexuality. The podcast was written and created by Aline Laurent-Mayard, and is produced by the French podcast company Paradiso Media.

The Podcast was honored as the winner of the Narrative Nonfiction Audio Storytelling Award at the 2023 Tribeca Festival.

== History ==
The podcast is an English-language adaptation of the French original in the Le Journal podcast by Laurent-Mayard, which received critical acclaim in France. The adaptation Free from Desire focuses on Laurent-Mayard's story of what it means to be aromantic and asexual.

== Format and structure ==
The podcast is a biographical narrative documentary by Aline Laurent-Mayard. In it, Laurent-Mayard discusses her discovery of being aromantic and asexual and what it means in a society that focuses so much on romance and sex. The podcast also features excerpts and interview segments with many notable experts of the field, such as David Jay and author Angela Chen.

== Media and events ==
- In May 2023, Laurent-Mayard gave an interview about the upcoming podcast.
- In June 2023, the podcast was featured in episode 265 of Sounds Fake but Okay with Laurent-Mayard as a guest, discussing Free From Desire.

== Awards and recognitions ==
In June 2023, the Podcast was honored as the winner of the Narrative Nonfiction Audio Storytelling Award at the 2023 Tribeca Festival.
