= Akemi Dawn Bowman =

Asian-American author

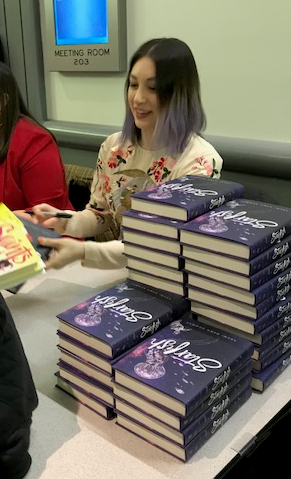
- Bowman autographing a book at the American Library Association's Youth Media Awards in 2018
- Born: United States
- Education: University of Nevada, Las Vegas (B.A.)
- Writing career
- Language: English
- Years active: 2017-now
- Genres: Young Adult fiction, Middle Grade fiction
- Notable works: Starfish, Summer Bird Blue, Harley in the Sky, The Infinity Courts series, Generation Misfits
- Notable awards: 2018 William C. Morris Award Finalist, 2022 Locus Award Finalist
- Website: www.akemidawnbowman.com

Akemi Dawn Bowman is an American author, best known for her William C. Morris Award Finalist young adult novel Starfish, which follows a Japanese-American teenager named Kiko Himura who grapples with a toxic home life and attempts to find a back-up plan after being rejected for a place at her dream art school. Bowman's earlier work centered around realistic fiction, but she now writes across genres, starting with her sci-fi series The Infinity Courts which was released in April 2021.

== Personal life ==
Bowman was born in Pittsburgh, Pennsylvania, and moved to Las Vegas, Nevada, when she was a toddler. Her father is from Hawaii and has Japanese and Chinese heritage, and her mother is mostly Italian and Irish. Bowman was home-schooled for four years, and attended the Las Vegas Academy as a band major in high school. After graduating, she served with the United States Navy for five years. She started writing her first full-length novel while on deployment. She has a degree in social studies from the University of Nevada, Las Vegas.

Bowman credits music as one of her big writing inspirations and had flute and piano lessons when she was younger. She often centers mental health in her novels because of her own experiences growing up.

In addition to writing novels, Bowman has written short fiction for the Magic: The Gathering online web story "Kamigawa: Neon Dynasty".

As of March 2020, she lives in Scotland with her family.

== Works ==
=== Novels ===
- Starfish (Simon & Schuster, 2017)
- Summer Bird Blue (Simon & Schuster, 2018)
- Harley in the Sky (Simon & Schuster, 2020)
- The Infinity Courts (Simon & Schuster, 2021)
- Generation Misfits (Macmillan, 2021)
- The Genesis Wars (Simon & Schuster, 2022)

=== Short stories ===
- in Kaito Origin Stories: A Test of Loyalty & The Path Forward (Magic: The Gathering online fiction, 2021)
- in Kamigawa: Neon Dynasty (Magic: The Gathering online fiction, 2022)
- in Being Ace: An Anthology of Queer, Trans, Femme, and Disabled Stories of Asexual Love and Connection (Page Street YA, 2023)

== Accolades ==
=== Starred reviews ===
- Starfish received starred reviews from Publishers Weekly and Booklist.
- Summer Bird Blue received starred reviews from Kirkus, Booklist, and School Library Journal.
- The Infinity Courts received a starred review from School Library Journal.
- Generation Misfits received starred reviews from School Library Journal and The Bulletin of the Center for Children's Books.

=== Honors ===
Starfish, Summer Bird Blue and Generation Misfits were each named a Junior Library Guild Gold Standard Selection. Bowman's first middle-grade novel Generation Misfits was featured on the July/August 2021 cover of The Bulletin of the Center for Children's Books, and received a Big Picture honor and a starred review. Starfish was chosen as a New York Public Library 2017 Best Book for Teens, and Summer Bird Blue was chosen for the same honor in 2018. Paste magazine called Starfish "the best debut YA novel the year" in 2017, and later declared it one of the top 30 young adult books of the 2010s. In 2021, Harley in the Sky was named a top pick for the Kansas NEA Reading Circle List High School Title. Locus magazine included The Infinity Courts in its annual Recommended Reading List for the year 2021.

== Awards ==
Won

- 2020 Winner of the MéMO Award for Best Teen Novel for Starfish

Nominated

- 2018 William C. Morris YA Debut Award for Starfish
- 2019 Colorado Blue Spruce Young Adult Book Award Nominee for Starfish
- 2020 Scottish Teenage Book Prize Finalist for Starfish
- 2020 Falkirk Red Book Award for Summer Bird Blue
- 2022 Locus Award Finalist in the Young Adult Novel category for The Infinity Courts
