= Sex Education (journal) =

Academic journal

- Discipline: Sex education
- Language: English
- Edited by: Peter Aggleton

Publication details
- History: 2001-present
- Publisher: Routledge
- Frequency: Bimonthly
- Impact factor: 1.649 (2017)

Standard abbreviations
- ISO 4: Sex Educ.

Indexing
- ISSN: 1468-1811 (print); 1472-0825 (web)
- OCLC no.: 50451119

Links
- Journal homepage; Online access; Online archive

Sex Education: Sexuality, Society and Learning is a peer-reviewed academic journal covering sex education. It was established in 2001, with Michael Reiss (University of London) as the founding editor-in-chief. It is published 6 times a year by Routledge and the current editor-in-chief is Peter Aggleton (University of New South Wales). According to the Journal Citation Reports, the journal has a 2017 impact factor of 1.649, ranking it 86th out of 238 journals in the category "Education & Educational Research".
