= Julie Sondra Decker =

American writer, YouTube personality and activist (born 1978)

Julie Sondra Decker (born January 17, 1978), also known by her YouTube name "swankivy", is an American writer, YouTuber, and activist known for her work on asexuality. She is particularly noted for a 2014 book on the subject, The Invisible Orientation.

== Biography ==
Decker was born in New Jersey on January 17, 1978. She mentions on her website that she started reading from an early age and has wanted to become an author since she was six years old. She attended and later graduated from the University of Florida with a degree in elementary education in 2000. She grew up in a family where her sisters were supportive of her and in which "alternative lifestyles" were considered acceptable.

Decker experimented with her sexuality in high school and found that she was generally uninterested in dating. Decker realized she was both asexual and aromantic when she was 14. When Decker was 19, she was sexually assaulted by a male friend who felt he could "fix" her asexuality. She eventually repelled him, and as she was leaving, he yelled out, "I just want to help you!" Before the Asexuality Visibility and Education Network (AVEN) was founded, Decker had described herself as nonsexual, but today uses the term asexual.

Decker lives and works in her hometown of Tampa, Florida. Decker feels that it is important to speak for "asexuals who are insecure or depressed."

== YouTube ==
Decker joined YouTube on September 26, 2006. Her earliest video uploaded is "SwankiVY sings "Popular" from Wicked" which was uploaded on 15 March 2008. Although she vlogs about many subjects, she is well known for her series "Letters To An Asexual" where she replies (usually in a sarcastic manner) to derogatory comments directed towards her or the asexual community. She is also known to cover songs from musicals on her channel such as Wicked but has also covered songs from Bat For Lashes, Tears For Fears and Smile.dk. She also has an additional account simply titled "JulieSondra" where she shares writing tips for struggling writers.

== The Invisible Orientation ==
In 2014, Decker released The Invisible Orientation: An Introduction to Asexuality. Library Journal wrote that The Invisible Orientation is "the first substantial book for the nonprofessional to emerge from the small but growing community of individuals who identify themselves as 'asexual,'" and called the book an important resource for understanding asexuality. Maclean's describes the book as using "plain, straightforward language" and helps readers understand various manifestations of asexuality. The book contains a variety of resources and information regarding asexuality and the misunderstanding that the asexual community faces in modern society. Decker includes a section for those who are trying to figure out if they are actually asexual or not. The book was later nominated for best LGBT Non-Fiction book award at the 27th Lambda Literary Awards. In 2015, Invisible Orientation won a silver IPPY award in the category of sexuality and relationships. Decker says that she wants the book to help change the "common narrative about what sexuality is."
