= Markovian Parallax Denigrate =

Mysterious Usenet posts

Markovian Parallax Denigrate is the name given to an internet mystery involving a series of hundreds of messages posted to Usenet in 1996. The texts have the appearance of gibberish.

The posts are often mentioned in conjunction with other bizarre and/or unsolved internet mysteries, such as Sad Satan, Cicada 3301 and the Publius Enigma. In 2012, Kevin Morris of The Daily Dot referred to the messages as "the Internet's oldest and weirdest mystery". It has also been described by Popmech.ru as "one of the first great mysteries of the Internet".

== Contents ==
Atlas Obscura reported that all the posts had the subject line "Markovian parallax denigrate". However, ciphermysteries.com stated instead that the three words appeared more frequently than other words in the message bodies.

=== Examples ===
These messages were posted 5th August 1996 to the alt.religion.christian.boston-church newsgroup.

From: Susan_Lindauer AT WORF.UWSP.EDU (Chris Brokerage)
Subject: Markovian parallax denigrate

jitterbugging McKinley Abe break Newtonian inferring caw update Cohen
air collaborate rue sportswriting rococo invocate tousle shadflower
Debby Stirling pathogenesis escritoire adventitious novo ITT most
chairperson Dwight Hertzog different pinpoint dunk McKinley pendant
firelight Uranus episodic medicine ditty craggy flogging variac
brotherhood Webb impromptu file countenance inheritance cohesion
refrigerate morphine napkin inland Janeiro nameable yearbook hark

From: Rob.Hotchkiss AT galactica.it (Myron Sterile)
Subject: Sistine detestation shotgun

hem burette you'd dendrite versatec plot homologue Godwin barbarism
psychobiology perfuse macaque Serpens orthodox phycomycetes
coadjutor scriven supreme Coriolanus whish minim protrude cardamom
hyacinth wet shame habitant Somali bewitch intimal egghead nitrate

== Proposed solutions ==
Early on, Susan Lindauer was mistakenly identified as a possible source of these posts. In 2012, Kevin Morris of The Daily Dot wrote an article looking at some possible solutions. He contacted Lindauer, who denied being the author of, or having any connection to, the messages. The article states the e-mail account belonging to a University of Wisconsin at Stevens Point student coincidentally named Susan Lindauer was spoofed to cover the identity of the poster.

Other proposed explanations for the texts include an early experimental chatbot or text generator, an internet troll or prankster posting forum spam, or a programmer experimenting with Markov chains.

In 2020, an article on the subject published by The A.V. Club proposes the event only became a mystery due to later media coverage, having not been widely reported prior to the 2012 Daily Dot article. The same article notes that YouTuber Barely Sociable made a contemporary video about this topic, opining that the messages were most likely simple spam with no hidden meaning.

== See also ==
- List of famous ciphertexts
- Numbers station
- Webdriver Torso
- Unfavorable Semicircle
