= List of Google Easter eggs =

A Pac-Man related interactive Google Doodle from 2010 will be shown to users searching for "Google Pacman" or "play Pacman".

The American technology company Google has added Easter eggs into many of its products and services, such as Google Search, YouTube, and Android since the 2000s. Some Easter eggs are created by employees in their 20% time. Google avoids adding Easter eggs to popular search pages and eggs that would negatively impact usability.

== Google Search ==
As Google searches are case insensitive, search terms listed are referred to in lower case.

=== General ===
- "2025 pn7" shows two moons moving across the screen.
- "67" and similar searches causes the screen to briefly wobble, akin to the hand gesture associated with the slang term.
- "angine de poitrine" or "angine de poitrine band" displays black (in light mode) or white (in dark mode) polka dots across the entire page, referencing the iconic polka-dot costumes worn by the eponymous Canadian rock duo during their performances. askew( see it ) appear on the screen.
- "autumnal equinox" causes the page to play an animation of falling autumn leaves to ring in the fall season.
- "baguette" shows a baguette icon which, when pressed, leads to a baguette catching game.
- "<blink>", "blink tag", or "blink html" includes samples of the blink element in the results.
- "boids" (and similar terms such as "starlings") causes the search results to flock together, similar to the artificial life program developed in 2000. It also works with "flock (birds)" and "flocking (behavior)".
- "cars", "cars 2", "cars 3" displays a lightning bolt icon at the bottom right. Clicking the lightning bolt causes Lightning McQueen (and other characters) to race across the screen with a "KA-CHOW!!" pop-up, this was used during celebrating the 20th anniversary of Cars.
- Edmund Fitzgerald displays a bell icon that when clicked rings. If clicked 29 times the fitzgerald crosses over the screen
- "chicxulub", "chicxulub asteroid", "meteorite", and similar terms will show an asteroid falling on the results page, causing the entire page to shake slightly.
- "christmas", "hanukkah", and "kwanzaa" will show decorations next to the search bar for each respective holiday. The feature used to be active only during December. Each year, new decorations are shown.
- "conway's game of life" on a desktop browser generates a running configuration of the game to the right of the search results. The process may also be stopped or altered by the user.
  - However, between March and June 2026, a bug caused the simulation to not progress on some devices but this has since been fixed.
- "dart asteroid" will show the probe hitting an asteroid, tilting the screen momentarily.
- "dinner for one" shows a black-and-white tiger face along with the results. Clicking on it results in an animated version of a running gag from the Dinner for One sketch being played back at the bottom edge of the window (specifically, where the butler trips over a tiger rug), turning everything black-and-white for a while.
- "diwali" will show a lamp which, when clicked, starts a lamp lighting game.
- "do a barrel roll" or "z or r twice" causes the result page to do a Star Fox-style barrel roll.
- "drop bear" would show a sign that when clicked would cause a drop bear to fall.
- festival activity, cause the results page to have a rainbow-themed header.
- "dutch angle" shows the results page in a slightly tilted angle.
- "dvd screensaver" or "dvd player" causes the Google logo in the top left corner of the screen to bounce around the screen, shifting colors between blue, red, yellow, and green every time it hits the page boundaries.
  - Every time the tab currently engaged in the Easter egg is returned to after being clicked out of, the bouncing logo will always be in a position where it hits perfectly into a corner.
  - However, this feature is disabled if a major Google Doodle is occurring instead of the normal logo.
- Equinox-related searches such as "spring equinox", "autumn season", "fall season", "vernal equinox", etc. display animated flowers (spring) or leaves (autumn) falling through the screen as of May 2026.
- "fat bear week" or "fat bear" will display a cartoon Alaskan brown bear at the bottom of the page. Clicking causes salmon to fall from the top of the page to "feed" the bear, which grows to fill the full page.
- "festivus" shows an image of the Festivus pole beside the search results and the message "A festivus miracle!" next to the number of search results.
- "fireworks", "fourth of july" and other search terms containing "fireworks" on US Independence Day – July 4th, will display simulated multi-colored fireworks for several seconds. This once worked for searches related to the United States semiquincentennial.
- Font names will change the search results to that font.
  - "arial" will change the search results to the Arial font.
  - "amatic sc font" will change the search results to the Amatic SC font. This was one of the fonts created by Vernon Adams before his death in 2016. It also works with "vernon adams font designer".
  - "calibri" or "luc de groot" will change the search results to the Calibri font.
  - "cambria font" will change the search results to the Cambria font.
  - "comic sans", "geocities", "design fails", "bad ux", "best font ever", "best typeface ever", "vincent connare" and "90s websites" will change the search results to the Comic Sans font, except on iOS devices where it will change to the Chalkduster font.
  - "coolvetica" will change the search results to the Coolvetica font.
  - "courier font" or "howard kettler" will change the search results to the Courier font.
  - "garamond" will change the search results to the Garamond font.
  - "georgia font" will change the search results to the Georgia font.
  - "impact font" will change the search results to the Impact font.
  - "merriweather font" will change the search results to the Merriweather font.
  - "open sans" or "steve matteson" will change the search results to the Open Sans font.
  - "permanent marker font" will change the search results to the Permanent Marker font.
  - "proxima nova font" or "mark simonson" will change the search results to the Proxima Nova font.
  - "roboto" will change the search results to the Roboto font.
  - "tahoma font" will change the search results to the Tahoma font.
  - "times new roman font", "stanley morison", "victor lardent", or "times new roman" will change the search results to the Times New Roman font.
  - "trebuchet ms" will change the search results to the Trebuchet MS font.
  - "verdana font", or "matthew carter" will change the search results to the Verdana font.
- "forrest gump" makes a male runner emoji appear at the top of the screen with more runners following him as he runs.
- "fortune cookie" will show a fortune cookie icon which, when clicked, will present a fortune that can be randomly chosen.
- "flyana boss" and similar searches have two female runner emojis glide across above the search.
- Searching anything that starts with "(do) you know who else" makes the AI overview reply with "My mom!" a reference to the Cartoon Network series Regular Show.
- "friends glossary" will show definitions for various quotes from the show.
- "georges seurat" adds a painting icon next to his name in the Knowledge Graph that, when clicked, makes the result appear in his signature pointillism style.
- "ghostbusters" around October will have three ghost emojis, followed by a van emoji, glide across the search.
- "google in 1998" on a desktop browser will generate a layout similar to the one Google used for its search engine in 1998.
- Another way to get the 1998 google layout is by looking up "zelda ocarina of time", the master sword will pop up and when clicked on it will take you to how google looked during 1998 also when the game first released.
- "googly eyes" will cause a pair of googly eyes to slide from the top of the page to cover each letter "O" in the top Google logo. The eyes will slowly follow the location of the cursor.
  - The same googly eyes appear when actors from Everything Everywhere All at Once are Googled (e.g. "michelle yeoh", "ke huy quan", "stephanie hsu"), in reference to the movie.
- "halloween" formerly resulted in a ghost appearing in the Knowledge Graph and when clicked, plays the 2016 Halloween Google Doodle. The search now shows the green team ghosts of the 2018 and 2022 Halloween doodles appearing over the screen.
  - "halloween" from October 28–31, 2025 brought up a marquee of Pac-Man being chased by Blinky, Pinky, Inky, and Clyde in different costumes each time they reappeared after reaching the end, as part of the 2025 Pac-Man Halloween doodle.
- "hannah montana" shows a hair wig button which, when clicked, makes Miley Stewart's normal brown hairstyle to fill up the entire screen and then switch to the trademark blonde wig from her Hannah Montana persona. This is to celebrate the 20th anniversary of the Disney Channel series of the same name.
- "haunted house" will bring up emojis of houses and spider webs above the results.
- "heartstopper" causes a trio of animated leaves to glide across the page.
- "hilary duff" shows a green butterfly button which, when clicked, makes butterflies to flutter around the screen, an allusion to her 2003 album Metamorphosis.
- "hollow knight", "silksong", or "hollow knight: silksong" will bring up a button that, when pressed, will cause Hornet's Needle to slash and destroy parts of the search results, likely to commemorate the release of Silksong after being in development for 8 years.
- "icc men's t20 world cup" and other terms will bring up a cricket game.
- "inside out", "inside out 2" and other similar searches will display a button in the bottom of the screen which will show a machine dispensing a memory orb every time the button is clicked, as part of the release of Inside Out 2.
- "isaac newton" an icon of a tree appears, which when clicked, drops an apple onto the page.
- "it" has a scared emoji being chased left and right near the search bar by a clown emoji with 3 balloons behind. This is a reference to the It novel by Stephen King and films by Andy Muschietti as Pennywise/"It"'s victims are usually kids who have fears that the clown can exploit. The red balloons are the most common tactic that Pennywise uses to make their victims scared. Famously, it is used in the opening scene in the book, in the first of the reboot films and in the miniseries where Pennywise uses a red balloon to lure Georgie into the sewer.
- "it follows" will cause an animation of a walking boy emoji chasing a running person emoji to glide across the page.
- "is google down" returns with "No".
- "is the earth flat" returns with "No, the Earth is roughly a sphere." Similar queries include "is the earth round" and "is the earth flat or round".
- "ive" will display a star button at the bottom of the page that allows users to paste sparkler stickers over the search, to celebrate the release of the group's singles "Bang Bang" and "Blackhole" and album Revive+ in February 2026.
- "jack o lantern" or "my name is Lewis" will have a jack-o'-lantern emoji appear over the search.
- "jimothy" will show the viral short, round-shaped raccoon running from the right of the screen. Clicking the green paw button below makes him run in the opposite direction, either at the top or bottom of the screen.
- "john cena" or just "cena" will cause a button with a waving hand to appear at the bottom of the screen. Clicking on the button will cause a large hand to appear in the middle of the screen doing the "you can't see me" waving gesture as the page vanishes. This was added following Cena's retirement from in-ring competition in 2025.
- "kerning" will add spaces between the letters of the word "kerning" in the search results. Kerning refers to the process of adjusting the space between letters in a word.
  - "keming" will remove spaces between the letters of the word "keming". This refers to improper kerning, particularly when not enough space is used between letters, which can cause mistakes like "kerning" to be read as "keming".
- "kpop demon hunters" will show the phrase "Couch! Couch! Couch!" repeatedly on top of the results, in reference to the animated film of the same name. There is also a button that can be clicked which will show a bouquet of flowers being thrown.
- "lewis capaldi" will show a message at the top of the search results saying "❤️ Welcome back Lewis – Someone we love ❤️", referencing his return to the stage after a two-year hiatus due to his Tourette's, and his hit song "Someone You Loved".
- "lionel messi" makes the phrase "🇦🇷 Gracias por todo, Capitán 🩵🤍" to slide leftwards above the search results. This was added following Messi's retirement from international football on August 31, 2026.
- "madonna", "who is madonna" and similar searches causes her name in bold and in uppercase to flash red and pink, and shoot green laser beams across the screen when clicked, as part of the release of her 2026 album Confessions II. This is only available on AI Overviews and AI Mode.
- "maine mendoza" shows "Welcome back!!!! Maine Mendoza" above the search results.
- "maned wolf" shows a button with a sun and a moon that when pressed, will show a watercolor drawing of a maned wolf. Clicking the button again makes the wolf to lower its head in the dark.
- "marc cucurella" or "cucurella" displays an animated brown domestic cat in a Spain kit at the bottom left corner of the screen waving a small Spanish flag, sporting the footballer's curly hairstyle, in reference to a popular internet meme leading up to the 2026 FIFA World Cup final.
- "marquee", "marquee tag", or "marquee html" will apply the marquee element to the results count at the top of the results.
- "memorial day" on Memorial Day will start a sequence saying "For all who sacrificed" and "Thank you" with poppies at the bottom.
- "meteorite" will have a single meteor fly down from the corner of the screen and shake the screen when it lands.
- "meteor shower" and "asteroid shower" will dim the screen and have a group of three meteors pass through it diagonally before returning to normal.
- "minecraft" and similar terms adds a grass block button that, when pressed, shows Steve's hand in the corner. Clicking on parts of the screen has the hand mine away that section, revealing a small Minecraft area. Steve can continue mining blocks to upgrade his pickaxe. When the popup is closed, a creeper appears and explodes, restoring the page to how it was before. It was created to celebrate the 15th anniversary of the game.
- "momota polar bear" or "momota" shows a traffic cone button that, when pressed, makes the viral polar bear cub Momota to appear from the bottom of the screen and red and blue traffic cones to stack on top of his head.
- "monarch butterfly" on September 4, 2025 would cause a button to appear at the bottom of the screen, which, when pressed, would cause images of monarch butterflies to fly over the screen.
- "mustache" will cause several different types of mustaches to appear under the two "o"s in the top Google logo.
- "naruto" makes a Leaf Village symbol appear. When clicked, it shows shadow clones appearing on the screen.
- "nasa dart" would show the Double Asteroid Redirection Test satellite crashing and making the screen tilted. Similar terms such as "dart mission" and "double asteroid redirection test" also show the animation.
- "new year's eve 2022" will show a party popper near the top of the search page. Clicking it will cause confetti to appear. This also works with other years replacing 2022 but it is for only 2000 and above (i.e. "new year's eve 2019").
- "ozzy osbourne" brings up scrolling text reading: " ..🤘 Thanks to the Mayhem, Prince of Darkness 🤘..🚃". This easter egg was added following Osbourne's death on July 22, 2025.
- "paddington", "paddington 2", or "paddington in peru" makes a sandwich button pop up which when clicked coats the edges of the search results with marmalade and makes a marmalade sandwich pop up, Paddington's signature food.
- "patrick stewart" will cause a purple button to appear at the bottom of the screen, displaying a quote from him and his birth-to-death date. This was added following his death on 28 October 2026.
- "perseverance rover" causes a small animated drone, which represents the flying probe ingenuity. Clicking it will transform the screen into the landscape of Mars.
- "pele", or "pelé" causes the "Goooo...gle" page indicator at the bottom of the page to read "Gooo...al" instead, with the last "o" replaced by a soccer ball. If one clicks on the ball, or the #10 under it, then it will play an animation where the a is kicking the soccer ball, and the "g" kicks it into the "l", which has been turned into a soccer goal. This was made to honor Pelé's 80th birthday.
- "pi" (or "calculator" and pressing P on the keyboard) and clicking the "π" symbol will start a memory game similar to Simon, in which the calculator highlights the digits of pi and prompts one to repeat the sequence. The sequence gets longer every turn. High-scores can be stored but will reset after reloading the page. The highest score possible is 314 digits.
- "planet of the bass" will display a bouncing set of emojis above the search results: "🎶 ✋👓🤚 🎶 ✋🕶️🤚 🎶", in reference to Kyle Gordon's hit 2024 song.
- "pokémon" or anything similar when searching on mobile will bring up a mini Pokéball at the bottom right of the screen which, when clicked, will allow one to catch all of the 151 original Pokémon as more Pokémon names are searched.
- "punch monkey" will result in little hearts themed after the viral Japanese macaque and a button to spawn more of them.
- "puppy", "puppies", "dog", "dog breeds" or "canine" will result in a button appearing in the panel that, when clicked, will cause any following clicks to bring a dog leg out and place a paw print at the mouse position, with a bark sound played.
  - A similar result appears if one types "kitten" or "cat" (but not "feline" or "kitty") where a near identical button appears, and instead of dog paw prints, and dog arms, it shows cat paw prints with a cat's arm. It also makes a cat meow to match.
- "qibla" and "eid al fitr"(or "eid'l fitr" and "eid al-fitr") will cause the "Goooo...gle" page indicator at the bottom of every result page to show nine cups and a pitcher instead.
- "ramadan" during the month of Ramadan will allow the initiation of a search of an image of a night sky for a crescent moon by clicking an image of a crescent moon in the Knowledge Panel. Upon finding the crescent moon, one is congratulated with the message "You found it! Ramadan Kareem to you and your loved ones!" as lanterns drop into view. This also worked during Eid al-Fitr month, but the message at the end was changed to "You found it! Eid Mubarak to you and your loved ones!"
- "rabbit rabbit rabbit" shows three rabbit emojis moving up and down at the top of the screen.
- "roblox" makes a button with a Noob face appear. Clicking it allows one to put stickers related to Roblox over the screen.
- "rrr" ("rrr") shows emojis of a horse rider and a person biking, referencing the characters of Alluri Sitarama Raju and Komaram Bheem from the 2022 Indian film.
- "snoopy" or "peanuts" will show a red button with a doghouse on the bottom right of the screen. Clicking it will show an animation of Snoopy flying behind different backgrounds as The Flying Ace, accompanied by Woodstock.
- "snowball" shows a snowball icon, clicking it will place a snowball wherever the user hits, similarly to the dog/cat easter egg. Snowflakes will also fall from the top of the screen.
- "solar eclipse 2024" makes an eclipse appear (also works with "solar eclipse").
- "spider-man", "peter parker" and similar terms causes Spider-Man to swing back and forth across the screen, jumbling the search results in the process; in promotion for Spider-Man: Brand New Day. Clicking the spiderweb button below repeats the animation.
- "spider-noir" makes white streaks fall down the screen, temporarily turning the page greyscale; this was made to promote the neo-noir series of the same name.
- "spongebob squarepants" or "spongebob movie" shows a flower cloud button, clicking it allows one to put stickers related to SpongeBob over the screen. This was made to promote The SpongeBob Movie: Search for SquarePants.
- "squid game" will have a brown button with a circle, square, and triangle on it which, when clicked, will start an interactive game of green light/red light; this was to celebrate the show's second season in December 2024.
- "star wars" and other Star Wars-related search terms on May 4 (Star Wars Day) summons a splash of confetti, some being characters/items from the Star Wars series.
- "street fighter" shows the punch button on the bottom right. When pressed, makes a punches the search results; this was done during live action film of Street Fighter.
- "stranger things" shows a 20-sided die which, when clicked, rolls to 1, making the screen red and turning everything akin to the Upside Down; this was to promote the show's fifth and final season in late 2025.
- "stray kids" and "skz" will show a spinning compass button which when clicked will unleash silhouette of crowds holding the group's light sticks and randomly showcase eight animal dolls (each one of them representing each Stray Kids member). It also features the message "Stray Kids Everywhere All Around The World," with the members saying the message as well.
- "suez canal" or "ever given" would show an emoji of a boat scrolling across the top of the screen, referencing the ending of the 2021 Suez canal obstruction.
- "supa hot fire" displays the quote "I'm not a rapper 😏" below the search bar as a reference to the rap battle between Supa Hot Fire and B-Bone hosted on YouTube, which became an internet meme.
- "super bowl" will show a green and black firework display in celebration of Philadelphia Eagles' victory over Kansas City Chiefs. In February 2021, fireworks celebrated the Tampa Bay Buccaneers' victory over the Chiefs.
- "superman", "krypto", and "supergirl" shows a pawprint button which, when pressed, will start the dog easter egg; instead of a normal paw, Krypto's paw will appear and the Superman theme will play. It was created to promote Superman (2025).
- "taylor swift" or "1989 (taylor's version)" shows a blue vault that when clicked opens and displays several different characters. The solution to these scrambled characters is 1989 (Taylor's Version). As of September 19, 2023, it will instead open and give the user one out of 89 different letter combinations that each spell out a quote from Taylor Swift. It also shows that there needs to be 33 million puzzles solved globally to reveal an audio message and visuals that reveal the titles of the so-called "Vault Tracks" on the 1989 (Taylor's Version) album.
  - To promote her 2025 album The Life of a Showgirl, searching "taylor swift" would result confettis falling from the Knowledge Graph and a burning heart could be seen scrolling in the middle of the search, with a message reading "And, baby, that's show business for you", a catchphrase used to promote the album.
- "text adventure" or "easter egg" using most popular modern browsers and opening the browser's developer console will trigger a text-based adventure game playable within the console. Responding "no" to "would you like to play a game" will print "the only winning move is not to play" in the console, referencing WarGames.
- "the amazing digital circus", "tadc" and similar terms will show a red and blue button shaped like Pomni's eye pupils which, when clicked, will show a pop up window of a computer terminal and make multiple laughing heads of Caine and Bubble to fill the screen in various sizes, as well as two keycaps with "Fun!" and "Delete" texts. Pressing "Fun!" will make more heads to spawn, whereas a progress bar titled "Purge Easter Egg" at the "Deleting…" process will appear when the "Delete" button is being pressed and the screen will go dark for a second right after the deleting process is over, removing all the heads in the process. This is to celebrate the release of the final episode of The Amazing Digital Circus. Clicking on the computer terminal redirects one to the finale.
- "the devil wears prada" and "the devil wears prada 2" will show a red high heel button which, when clicked, makes a pair of red high heels with devil tridents walk across the page; this is to celebrate the release of The Devil Wears Prada 2.
- "the nightmare before christmas" around October will have various emojis of pumpkins, gifts, scorpions, swords, bombs, and bones glide over the search.
- "the last of us" or "cordyceps" will bring up a red mushroom button; when pressed, cordyceps will appear on the screen; it is possible to press the button several times to multiply the mushrooms. This was made to promote the 2023 TV series adaptation.
- "the legend of zelda" "master sword" "zelda" "ocarina of time" or anything else related, shows the Master Sword on the bottom right. Clicking the Master Sword triggers the same effect as "Google in 1998", and clicking again changes the results back to normal. This was uploaded the day the 2026 remake of The Legend of Zelda: Ocarina of Time released, with the original game being released in 1998.
- "oscar winners" results in an Oscar icon popping up and flowers being thrown out of it.
- "the odyssey" will show a Trojan horse button which, when clicked, makes a Trojan horse to slide from the left side of the screen and spawn a warrior from its womb, taking the top search results away; clicking the button again causes the horse to fade out and the top search results to reappear. This was added nearing the release of Christopher Nolan's The Odyssey film.
- "tim payne" makes a soccer ball with the text "The Main Character" rise from the bottom of the screen, in reference to the New Zealand footballer's increase in popularity going from 5,000 to 5 million followers after being listed as the "least known" player heading into the 2026 FIFA World Cup. Clicking on the confetti button sends soccer balls into the air.
- "toni stone" on February 9, 2022 had a splash of confetti.
- "toy story", "toy story 2", "toy story 3", "toy story 4", "toy story 5" and similar searches will display a button that, when pressed, makes a claw machine come down and grab the search results; this was added nearing the release of Toy Story 5.
- "valentine's day" will show a heart next to a "H" and "Cl" and when pressed, takes one to the "Chemistry CuPd" game from the 2024 Valentine's Day doodle.
- "velma" will show confetti along with pride and lesbian flags; this was added after Scooby-Doo character Velma Dinkley was confirmed to be a lesbian, which resulted in her standalone TV series.
- "vernal equinox" will cause an animation to play similar to the autumnal equinox search result, but will instead show falling flower blossoms.
- "webdriver torso" turns the Google logo into moving colored blocks. This is a reference to an automated YouTube channel made by Google to test YouTube's performance. This does not work on mobile devices or when there is a Google Doodle instead.
- "wordle" will turn the Google logo into a round of Wordle and guess the words "COLUMN", "GOALIE", and "GOOGLE".
- Whenever a search does not match any results, Google shows a cartoonish yeti trying to catch a fish on ice. Clicking on the yeti will play an animation of him fishing a random object (e.g., a fish, a can of fish, a boot, and a bent can) in a hole, and then tossing it in a bucket. The boot and the bent can will make the yeti sad, and the fish and the can of fish will make him smile. This is only available when one is signed in.
- Searching any ongoing major tennis tournament (with men's singles and doubles, women's singles and doubles, and mixed doubles) will result in a Pong-like mini-game available by scrolling to the right of the scores. This mini-game is also available for past tennis tournaments by searching for the name of the tournament and the year in which the tournament was held.

=== Did you mean ===
A Google web search for:

- "alex trebek" shows "Did you mean: who is alex trebek" in reference to Jeopardy!'s rule of answers being in the form of a question.
- "anagram" shows "Did you mean: nag a ram".
  - "define anagram" shows "Did you mean: nerd fame again".
  - "anagram" and "define anagram" also work in other languages. For example, a Google ES search for "anagrama" shows Quizás quisiste decir: gama rana".
- "assistant regional manager" shows "Did you mean: assistant to the regional manager", referencing The Office.
  - "world's best boss" shows "Did you mean: Michael Scott".
- "blue prince" shows "Wait, did you say: blueprints", referencing the eggcorn of "blue prince" and "blueprints" sounding very similar when said aloud.
  - "erajan" shows "Ulein Ovlor: blue prince". "Ulein ovlor", literally "you dream towards word", is a rough translation of the phrase "did you mean" into the fictional language of Erajan used in the video game Blue Prince.
- "bruno madrigal" shows "Did you mean: we don't talk about bruno", referencing the titular song from Encanto.
- "curt cignetti" shows "Yup, he won.", referencing his viral quote "I win. Google me." from his first press conference in 2023 and was added after the 2026 CFB National Championship.
- "emacs" shows "Did you mean: vim", and vice versa when searching "vim". This is a reference to the vim vs Emacs editor war. Searching for "vi" formerly resulted in the same result as "Did you mean: emacs", but was later changed to "vim".
- "han shot first" shows "Did you mean: greedo shot first", and vice versa when searching "greedo shot first". This is a reference to a controversial change made to a scene in Star Wars (1977), in which Han Solo is confronted by bounty hunter Greedo; in the original scene, Solo shoots Greedo dead, but later versions are edited so that Greedo fires first.
- "a knight of the seven kingdoms" shows "Ser, did you mean: a knight of the nine kingdoms". This is a reference to the TV series of the same name. Ser is the in-universe spelling of Sir, a title used to address knights. Most of the series is set on a continent called Westeros, which is commonly described as having nine distinct regions in the show's canon. The customary name The Seven Kingdoms is a vestige of an earlier territorial division immediately after Aegon's Conquest, the war that first unified the continent. In the series, Egg humorously corrects Ser Duncan on this point.
- "lee sang-hyeok" shows "Did you mean: the unkillable demon king", referencing the nickname of Faker, one of the most popular League of Legends players.
- "mia thermopolis" shows "Did you mean: amelia mignonette thermopolis renaldi princess of genovia", referencing The Princess Diaries.
- "recursion" shows a "Did you mean: recursion", linking to the same search over and over again.
  - This also happens with "groundhog day", referencing the recursion present in the film of the same name.
- "snakecase vs camelcase" shows "Did you mean: snake_case vs camelcase", referencing the naming convention that underscores separate words in many programming languages.
- "steamed hams" shows "Did you mean: steamed clams", referencing The Simpsons episode "22 Short Films About Springfield", which became a popular meme.
- "the one ring" shows "Did you mean: my precioussss" in reference to Gollum's name for it in The Lord of the Rings.
- "tina turner" shows "Did you mean: simply the best", referencing her song "The Best".
- "war in ba sing se" shows "Did you mean: there is no war in Ba Sing Se", referencing Avatar: The Last Airbender, in which characters try to prevent the rumors of war.
- "wingardium leviosa" shows "Did you mean: win gar dium levi ohhh sa", referencing Harry Potter and the Philosopher's Stone, in which a character corrects the pronunciation of a peer.
- "wubba lubba dub dub" shows "Did you mean: i am in great pain please help me", referencing the adult animated science fiction sitcom Rick and Morty. When using Google Assistant, it responds with "Are you in pain? How can I help?", "Sorry, I don't speak Birdperson" or "Morty, let's get Schwifty".
- "widow's bay" shows "Did you mean: the next martha’s vineyard and definitely not cursed", referencing the show's titular island with ambitions to become a tourist destination similar to Martha's Vineyard despite the island being haunted.

=== Knowledge Graph ===
A Google web search for:

- "all i want for christmas is you" or "mariah carey" will show snowflakes falling from the Knowledge Graph, representing Mariah Carey's popularity in the Christmas culture, as well as her Christmas anthem "All I Want for Christmas Is You". This was generally used throughout December until Christmas Day.
- "axolotl" or "lake xochimilco" shows a yellow axolotl which when clicked, will show a doodle celebrating Lake Xochimilco.
- "bletchley park" shows the name of the attraction being decoded in the Knowledge Graph.
- "bts" shows a purple heart with a microphone inside it, which when clicked will make purple balloons fly along with heart-shaped ones. When any of the heart-shaped balloons are clicked, a message from one of the members of BTS will show up along with that respective member saying "I purple you." and a different colored microphone for each one; sky blue for RM, pink for Jin, black for Suga, silver for J-Hope, gold for Jimin, green for V, and violet for Jungkook.
- "bubble tea" shows a cup filled with bubble tea bouncing left to right, which when clicked will show a doodle celebrating bubble tea.
- "case closed", "detective conan" or "shinichi kudo" will show an APTX-4869 pill which when clicked, will blur the page until it zooms out into a gray background.
- "cat" will show a button with a paw print on it. Clicking it will cause cat arms to appear and leave paw prints wherever clicked, with meowing sound effects.
- "cherry blossom", "sakura tree", or typing a cherry blossom emoji ("🌸") will show a pink flower, which when clicked will show petals falling down. This Easter egg is more common during the cherry blossom season, which is the moment when cherry trees start to bloom in the spring.
- "clara rockmore" or just "rockmore" shows Clara Rockmore in the Knowledge Graph, which when clicked will show a doodle celebrating her 105th birthday.
- "doctor who" will show a 3-Dimensional TARDIS spinning in the Knowledge Graph which when clicked, will show a doodle of Doctor Who. Further clicks on the play symbol within the doodle will cause a Dalek to steal the word Google. Then, the Doctor can be clicked on, starting a small game.
- "earth day" will show a bee flying across Earth, which when clicked will start a doodle that Google made in 2020 to celebrate Earth Day's 50th anniversary.
- "fresh prince of bel-air", in celebration of the 30th anniversary of The Fresh Prince of Bel-Air in 2020, displayed a replica of the "FRESH" license plate in the Knowledge Graph. Clicking on the license plate would cause a taxi to move by the screen, and the search results to acquire a 90s theme with various references and jokes alluding to people and places across the show via audio clips and animations. Clicking the bar at the top of the page/the "freeeeeeeeeeesh" at the bottom would cause one of the characters to scream as they fell down the screen, and then the page would flip back to the original results and design.
- For the 25th anniversary of Friends, Google embedded Easter eggs for Chandler Bing, Phoebe Buffay, Monica Geller, Ross Geller, Rachel Green, and Joey Tribbiani in their respective Knowledge Graphs. Chandler's Easter egg was temporarily removed, following Matthew Perry's death on October 28, 2023, before being restored sometime in mid-November.
- "hip hop" shows a bouncing radio in the Knowledge Graph, which when clicked will show a doodle celebrating the 44th anniversary of hip-hop.
- "holi" shows a picture of bowls of colored powder in the Knowledge Graph which, when clicked, will simulate throwing a gob of powder at the page where clicked. Further clicks on the page will simulate further gobs of colored powder being thrown to that point. A raindrop icon appears which, when clicked, will cause the page to be washed clean of colored powder. Also note that Goo...gle in the end of the page will show bowls of colored powder instead of letter o's.
- Searching various instruments, such as "drums", "saxophone", and "triangle" will show their respective sounds in the Knowledge Graph.
- "juneteenth" will show a button, clicking on it will display an animation at the bottom and also rain red, black and green confetti.
- "jerry lawson" will show an 8-bit sprite of Jerry walking forwards, which when clicked will start a doodle that Google made in 2022 to celebrate Jerry's 82nd birthday, which the 8-bit sprite was from, but not used.
- "johann sebastian bach" shows a 3D animation of a man on a piano which when clicked will start a doodle celebrating Bach's 334th birthday.
- "katamari", "we love katamari", or "katamari damacy" makes a ball next to the word "Katamari" appear in the Knowledge Graph. When clicked, one can play Katamari with the page elements.
- "la tomatina" will add an animation of a jumping tomato next to the summary of Tomatina. When clicked, one can now throw tomatoes onto the website by clicking anywhere, referencing the festival. At the bottom, a button also appears to wash the thrown tomatoes off.
- "loteria" shows two cards one with a heart and the other with the Google "G", which when clicked will show a doodle about lotería.
- "legally blonde" shows a pink purse next to the Knowledge Graph, which when clicked, has Elle Woods' pet chihuahua Bruiser jump out of the purse and walk to a pink salon chair which dresses him in his "signature sweater". He then walks back and jumps into the purse, with Elle, played by Reese Witherspoon, saying, "Hi, I'm Elle Woods, and this is Bruiser Woods, and we're both Gemini vegetarians." Once the animation is complete, the color of the links on the page change from their usual blue to pink to match Elle's "signature look".
- "mandelbrot" or "benoit mandelbrot" shows a Mandelbrot set in the Knowledge Graph. Clicking the set opens an interactive fractal viewer.
- "mars 2020", "perseverance rover", or "ingenuity" will show the Ingenuity helicopter that when clicked, flies around the screen.
- Nearing the 2024 theatrical release, searching "mean girls" (either the 2004 film or the 2024 musical film) will show a lipstick which, when clicked, will turn the screen pink and allow one to click and place icons from the "Burn Book". The 2011 sequel apparently is not affected.
- Searching the name of a musical instrument will show button which plays it when clicked or tapped.
- "newton" or "isaac newton" will show a button with an apple tree. When clicked, an apple will fall from the top of the screen.
- "new year's eve" or ''new year's day'' shows a cannon next to the Knowledge Graph which when clicked, makes confetti explode.
- "panipuri" will show three types of panipuris in the Knowledge Graph, which when clicked will show a doodle celebrating panipuri.
- "petanque" shows a pear holding a ball, which, when clicked, will show a doodle celebrating Pétanque.
- "pluto planet" describes Pluto as "Our favorite dwarf planet since 2006" in the Knowledge Graph.
- "popcorn" shows an image of popcorn, which when clicked leads to a doodle celebrating popcorn.
- "pride" (LGBTQ culture) will show a rainbow colored heart which when pressed will show a pride parade animation. Clicking a button which appears as a flag icon will show different pride flags; as of February 2025 this features the Rainbow flag, transgender flag, lesbian flag, pansexual flag, bisexual flag, asexual flag, aromantic flag, intersex flag, non-binary flag, agender flag, genderqueer flag, polysexual flag, demisexual flag, and genderfluid flag in a random order.
- "puppy", "puppies", "dog", "dog breeds" or "canine" will result in a button appearing in the panel that, when clicked, will cause any following clicks to bring a dog leg out and place a paw print at the mouse position, with a bark sound played.
  - A similar result appears if one types "kitten" or "cat" (but not "feline" or "kitty") where a near identical button appears, and instead of dog paw prints, and dog arms, it shows cat paw prints with a cat's arm. It also makes a cat meow to match.
- "scoville" shows three red peppers with faces on them, which when clicked will show a doodle celebrating Wilbur Scoville's 151st birthday.
- "severance" shows a cluster of blue balloons floating on the screen once a button is clicked, as a visual nod to a scene in the Apple TV+ series Severance.
- "sonic the hedgehog game", "green hill zone" and ''sonic'' shows Sonic the Hedgehog, in his original 16-bit appearance, waiting. Clicking or tapping Sonic will make him spin; if clicked or tapped 25 times, he transforms into Super Sonic.
- "splatoon", "splatoon", "splatoon 2", or "splatoon 3" will display colorful splat blobs in the Knowledge Graph. Clicking on it allows one to splat blobs of ink on the screen in the colors of the Google logo. Some splats have eyes in them, or shaped like squids and octopuses ,Which is a reference to the Turf wars in splatoon franchise.
- "super mario brothers", "mario" or "super mario" shows a Knowledge Graph for Super Mario Bros. that contains a flashing "?" block which generates a coin and 200 points when clicked. After 100 coins are collected, the "1UP" sound plays. This was also added in 2023 when searching for The Super Mario Bros. Movie near the film's theatrical release.
- "westminster dog show" or "puppy", in celebration of the 2022 Westminster Kennel Club Dog Show which took place over a five-day period from June 18 to 22, will show a purple button with the silhouette of a paw print at the top of the search results. An animation of a dog's paw pressing the button will play as the page goes idle. Clicking on the button will cause the button to disappear, and a dog will bark as it presses down on the page and leaves a paw print in its place. Clicking anywhere else on the page will cause more dogs to bark as they leave their paw prints on the results page. Clicking on the "X" at the bottom will cause a water animation/effect to play with the sounds of a sink as the paw print(s) are washed off of the search results.
  - Searching "best in show", a film about a similar dog show, activates this Easter egg as well.
- Searching any of the 12 zodiacs shows a button of their respective constellations. When clicked on, a related animation plays across the page.

=== Embedded tools ===
A Google web search for:

- "breathing exercise" will have a 60-second breathing exercise.
- "bubble level" on a mobile device will have an interactive spirit level. However, this is not supported on other devices.
- "christmas" will cause a wrapped present to fall from the top of the screen into the webpage embedded. Clicking on this will take the user to Google Santa Tracker.
- "color picker" will provide a color picker and a conversion between RGB and hexadecimal color values. Selecting "Show color values" will also show conversions to the CMYK, HSL and HSV color models.
- "earth day quiz" will pull up an Earth Day quiz to see what animal one is.
- "emoji kitchen" will bring up an interactive tool by which a user can combine two different emojis together and copy the result as an image to their device's clipboard.
- "flip a coin" will flip a coin: heads or tails.
- "fun facts" or "i'm feeling curious" will show a fun fact. Once a search result has been given, clicking on "Ask another question" will show another question. It will show a short fact in about 1-3 sentences and a link to the website where the fact was found within a featured box at the top of the search results.
- "google doodles" will result in showing a random playable Google Doodle and also show an archive of other playable Doodles.
- "google logo history" results in a slideshow of the changes to the Google logo, starting with the logo used today and ending with one of the first logos from 1998.
- "google tuner" will provide an instrument tuner that, via an authorized microphone, will listen to one playing an instrument and with a GUI, will show how to bring the instrument in tune.
- "memory game" will pull up a memory game that one can play to test your memory.
- "metronome" will have a metronome that can be adjusted from 40 to 218 BPM.
- "minesweeper" will result in a "Minesweeper" card. By selecting Play, one can play Minesweeper, with 3 difficulties, being Easy (10 by 8 grid with 10 mines), Medium (18 by 14 grid with 40 mines), and Hard (24 by 20 grid with 99 mines).
- "pac-man", "google pacman", or "play pacman" will show the Pac-Man related interactive Google Doodle from 2010. Clicking Insert Coin twice will enable a second player, Ms. Pac-Man.
- "periodic table" will have an interactive 3d element from the periodic table, clicking the "explore elements" button will navigate to artsexperiments.withgoogle.com
- "play dreidel" or "dreidel" will spin a dreidel, landing on one of four letters of the Hebrew alphabet: נ (Nun), ג (Gimel), ה (He) or ש (Shin).
- "random number generator" or "rng" will generate a random number. The starting range is between 1 and 10, but the maximum and minimum can be adjusted. Changing the maximum or minimum to a number with more than 10 digits will generate a dizzy face emoji (😵). Changing both the maximum and the minimum to 100 will generate a hundred points symbol (💯).
- "roll a die" will roll a six-sided die, and since c. August 2019, four, eight, ten, twelve or twenty-sided dice individually or as multiples in user selected combinations, all with an optional modifier to either add or subtract from the roll total.
- "snake", "play snake", "snake game" and "snake video game" will result in a "Play Snake" card. By selecting Click to Play, one can play the game on both desktop and mobile. By clicking the cog next to the play button, they can customize the game and even change the game mode. This is regularly updated with new features.
- "solitaire" will have a playable game of solitaire. Users can select between two modes: easy and hard.
- "spinner" will have an interactive spinning wheel and a fidget spinner which can be toggled via the switch. For the spinning wheel, a dropdown menu can change the number of numbers on the wheel, from 2 to 20. Whereas for the fidget spinner, users have to mimic a rotating motion in order for the spinner to spin.
- "stopwatch" and "timer" will provide interactive timing methods; the stopwatch counting up and the timer counting down. Both tools are shown for each search term. Variants such as "set a timer for 10 minutes" can be used.
- "tic tac toe" or "terni lapilli" will show a playable game of tic-tac-toe. Users can select to play against the browser at different levels – "easy", "medium" or "hard" (called "impossible") – or against a friend.
- "tip calculator" will show a tip calculator that can help users to tip someone.
- "translate" will show an embedded version of Google Translate tool in the search results, and in advance of Thanksgiving 2020, a turkey language was added to the selection of languages to which translations could be made. An example translation provided by sources for "how's it going" results in "gobble gobble gobble gobble". All results are "Poultry Verified".
- "what sound does a dog make" will sound out what a dog will make. The word "dog" can be replaced with other animals in the search query.

=== Google birthday surprise spinner ===
Searching for "google birthday surprise spinner" will result in a wheel that spins to one of a selection of playable Google Doodles, tools (see above) and games. Whichever is randomly selected may be opened, or the wheel may be spun again. It was added in celebration of Google's 19th birthday.

=== Calculator ===
In late 2011, Google added a graphical calculator to search results, using natural language processing to determine that search results might be mathematical in nature. Woven into this feature are several, not entirely academic, results which might be considered Easter eggs.

A Google web search for:

- "a baker's dozen" shows the additional result "1 baker's dozen = 13".
- "once in a blue moon" will give the additional result of "once in a blue moon = 1.16699016 × 10^{−8} hertz".
- "the answer to [the ultimate question of] life the universe and everything" provides the answer "42" as a result in reference to the Douglas Adams novel series, "The Hitchhiker's Guide to the Galaxy". It is believed to be the first Google Easter egg, predating the calculator in which it is now revealed.
- "the number of horns on a unicorn" shows the number "1" on the calculator.
- "what is the loneliest number" shows the number "1" in the calculator.
- The result of multiple Easter eggs may be calculated; for example: "negative of the number of horns on a unicorn minus the answer to life the universe and everything" will return "-43".
- Ahead of Pi Day 2021, Google added an Easter egg game to the calculator tool which tested players' knowledge and memory of Pi.

== Google Maps and Google Earth ==
- Visiting "Salford Lads' Club" with 3D buildings activated will show Morrissey of The Smiths at the entrance. The club was featured in the cover art of the Smiths' album The Queen Is Dead.
- A 3D buildings Easter egg involves a scene involving a bridge jump from The Blues Brothers, which is recreated in Google Earth at the Tacony–Palmyra Bridge linking New Jersey and Philadelphia.

=== Directions ===
- In early test versions of Google Maps, searching for a route between locations separated by expanses of water (for example, Paris and New York City) provided road directions to the coast of the embarkation country (in this case, the west coast of France) before suggesting "Swim the Atlantic Ocean (3,500 miles)" or another ocean for a different distance.
- While Google Maps' walking directions were in beta, requesting them from the start point of "The Shire" or "Rivendell" to the destination of "Mordor", the directions returned the warning: "Use caution – One does not simply walk into Mordor."
- When navigating from Snowdon to the Brecon Beacons, one could choose to travel by dragon, which took 21 minutes.
- When navigating from Urquhart Castle to Fort Augustus, one could choose to travel by the Loch Ness Monster, which took 25 minutes.
- When navigating from Magdalene College to President's Lodge Queens College, one could choose to be punted, which took 45 minutes.
- Searching for public transportation from Windsor Castle to Buckingham Palace would offer the Royal Carriage option.

=== Fictional places ===
- New York City in 1926 as seen in the Harry Potter spin-off film Fantastic Beasts and Where to Find Them can be visited. Fans can visit MACUSA (Magical Congress of the USA); Steen National Bank; the underground speakeasy The Blind Pig; and the magical apartment of Tina and Queenie Goldstein, two of the film's key characters.
- In Street View, on Earls Court Rd, London, United Kingdom, a TARDIS from the science fiction series Doctor Who is on display. Street View allows one to enter the TARDIS where it is "Bigger on the Inside" and explore the set actually used in the show.
- In celebration of the release of Batman v Superman: Dawn of Justice, users could explore Bruce Wayne's residence and the Batcave.
- Searching for "R'lyeh" would take users to the coordinates of the sunken city. It was listed as a "Place of worship".

=== Video games ===
- For April Fools' Day 2015, in certain areas in Google Maps, there was a button which started a game of Pac-Man, controlled by arrow keys and using the roads as paths for Pac-Man to travel along.
  - A similar feature was brought back for April Fools' Day 2017, allowing users to play a version of Ms. Pac-Man upon clicking the icon on the Google Maps webpage or mobile app.
- On Mario Day (March 10) 2018, Google and Nintendo had partnered up to bring Mario into Google Maps mobile app worldwide for a week. A yellow icon with a question mark would show up at the bottom of the directions page, next to the start navigation button. Tapping on the icon would allow one to have Mario and his kart as the navigation arrow. Tapping the icon 100 times would activate a 1-UP sound like in Nintendo's games.

=== Extraterrestrial ===
- With the release of Google Earth 5, the Mars feature allowed users to speak to a primitive ELIZA clone on the planet, by searching for "Meliza".
- On July 20, 2005, the 36th anniversary of the first human landing on the Moon, Google debuted a version of Google Maps that included a small segment of the surface of the Moon. It is based entirely on NASA images and includes only a very limited region. Panning causes the map to tile. Zooming to the closest level used to show that the Moon was made of cheese. The map also gives the locations of all Moon landings, and the Google Moon FAQ humorously mentions a connection to the Google Copernicus hoax, which Google claimed to be developing. Supposedly, by 2069, Google Local will support all lunar businesses and addresses.

=== Pegman ===
Trigger location or occasion	Pegman's appearance	Ref.
Dragged onto Legoland in Carlsbad	Lego minifigure	
Dragged onto Sun Valley, Idaho	Skier	
Near all United States national parks	Park ranger	
Dragged onto the coast of Hawaii, Florida, Bali, or The Galápagos Islands	Mermaid	
Dragged onto Telegraph Avenue in Berkeley, CA	Wearing a tie-dyed shirt	
Dragged near the Arthur Ashe Stadium, Flushing Meadows–Corona Park	Tennis player holding a racket	
Dragged near the Kennedy Space Center	Astronaut	
Dragged around Groom Lake in Nevada and Area 51	UFO	
Dragged around the southern point of Half Moon Island, Antarctica, where Streetview is available	Penguin	
Loch Ness	Green Loch Ness Monster wearing a tartan hat	
Around some royal residences, such as Buckingham Palace (and the surrounding palaces), The Palace of Holyroodhouse and Hillsborough Castle	A representation of Queen Elizabeth II, "PegMa'am". Following the death of Elizabeth II in 2022, this Easter egg was removed.	
For the release of Star Wars: The Force Awakens	Star Wars Stormtrooper or X-wing fighter pilot	
For the release of the video game The Legend of Zelda: Twilight Princess HD for the Wii U	Link holding a Master Sword and a Hylian Shield	
Around February 8, the launch day of Google Maps	Dressed as a birthday cake	
For Google Street View's 10th birthday & for the user's birthday	As if he is celebrating a birthday, wearing a red and white striped miniature party hat and holding three pastel violet, pink, and blue balloons in his right hand. A similar appearance was used on Street View's 15th anniversary on April 24–25, 2022.	
Viewing past Street Views	Emmett "Doc" Brown, one of the protagonists from the Back to the Future universe	
Halloween	Rides a broomstick	
Valentine's Day	Stands upon a heart	
Christmas week	Snowman	
Concert venues for Blackpink's Deadline World Tour	Woman in an anime style, dressed in a white shirt, skirt, and cat ears, wielding a hammer.	
Dragged near New York City	Dua Lipa	

== Google Translate ==
- On November 29, 2010, Reddit user "harrichr" posted details of "how to make Google beatbox for you!" and soon after, Robert Quigley reported the discovery in an article on "geekosystem.com" (now The Mary Sue), stating that he was "Not sure if this falls in the category of Easter Egg or clever manipulation" and that although he had "No idea why", it transpired that using Google Translate to translate nonsense text of all consonants from German to German and clicking Listen would result in machine generated speech that sounded like beatboxing. As time went on, redditors and other interested parties experimented with translation combinations, posting their results on sites including Hacker News where reader "iamdave" is reported to have posted "a pretty comprehensive Google Translate beatboxing guide". Three years later Time magazine published an article indicating that Google had acknowledged the existence of this "feature" with an Easter egg "Beatbox" tooltip when hovering over the "speaker icon" button after setting everything up to the aforementioned specification.
- In January 2018, a Reddit user posted a discovery that when using Google Translate to translate the Funniest Joke in the World ("Wenn ist das Nunstück git und Slotermeyer? Ja! Beiherhund das Oder die Flipperwaldt gersput!") from German to English, the result was "[FATAL ERROR]".
- Past August 27, 2023, translating "happy birthday" and pressing enter, will rain Google-colored confetti, on the occasion of Google's 25th birthday.

== Google homepage ==
- Rolling over the I'm Feeling Lucky button causes the button text to spin, landing on a random phrase. Clicking on the button without text in the search bar will serve the corresponding web page.

I'm feeling	Result
Doodley	Random Google Doodle
Artistic	Random Google art project
Hungry	Google search for "restaurants" or "dinner recipes"
Trendy	Google Hot Trends
Adventurous	Random probability-related Google widget
Stellar	Random space-related image
Funny	Random humor-related Google search or Charlie Chaplin's Google Doodle
Curious	Random question and answer or Google easter egg
Playful	Random interactive Google Doodle
Puzzled (discontinued)	"A Google A Day" home page
Wonderful (discontinued)	Random "World Wonder" project
Generous (discontinued)	Google "One Today" homepage

=== Google languages ===
Google formerly offered interfaces for several different fictional languages. Users could set any of these languages (except pig Latin) as their search settings' preferred language. As of 2026, Google has seemingly removed these languages.

Language	URL
Bork	www.google.com/?hl=xx-bork
Elmer Fudd	www.google.com/?hl=xx-elmer
Hacker (Leet)	www.google.com/?hl=xx-hacker
Klingon	www.google.com/?hl=xx-klingon
Pig Latin	www.google.com/?hl=xx-piglatin
Pirate	www.google.com/?hl=xx-pirate

=== Google subpages ===
The teapot found at Google's 418 error page

- When Ken Perlin visited Google in February 2000, Sergey Brin asked him for a version of an interactive jumping heart character he'd created as a Java applet to be put on the Google site for Valentine's Day. "www.google.com/heart" will redirect to an archived page which is a preservation of the old, but still functional, Google interface, complete with the Valentine's heart and a banner that states "This site is an old friend from Google's past, kept in its original form. Enjoy!"
- "www.google.com/humans.txt" is a simple plain text file serving to remind its readers that Google is created by a large team of humans using many technologies. It asks for interested readers to visit their careers page.
- "www.google.com/teapot" states, "418. I'm a teapot. The requested entity body is short and stout. Tip me over and pour me out." Clicking on the picture of the teapot or tilting the mobile device will result in an animation of it pouring tea into a teacup. The web page is a reference to the Hyper Text Coffee Pot Control Protocol.

== Android ==
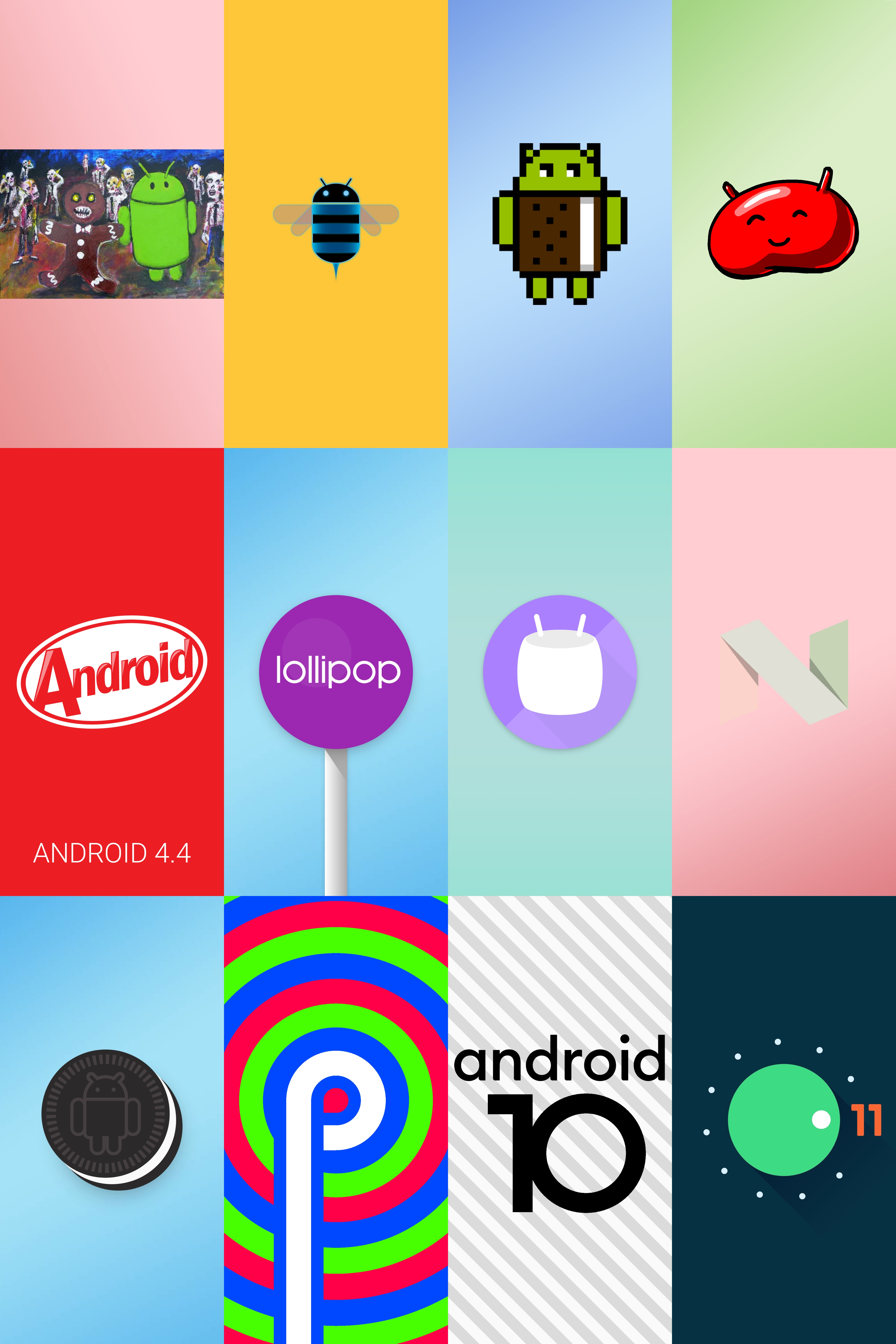
All Android Easter eggs from 2.3 'Gingerbread' to 11 'Red Velvet Cake'

- Since the version 2.3 (Gingerbread) of Google's Android operating system an Easter egg has been hidden. The Easter egg can be accessed through the "Settings" application, in the "About phone" section, by repeatedly tapping the "Android version" section. The animation is different in every version of the OS.
  - In 2.3 – 2.3.7 (Gingerbread) there is a painting of an Android next to a zombie gingerbread man, surrounded by zombies using cellphones. This artwork has been drawn by Jack Larson.
  - In 3.0 – 3.2.6 (Honeycomb) there is a blue honeybee. Below it, there is the text "REZZZZZZZ..." as a reference to Tron: Legacy.
  - In 4.0 – 4.0.4 (Ice Cream Sandwich) there is pixel art of an ice cream sandwich android. Long-pressing it will result in many ice cream sandwich androids flying across the screen, dubbed the "nyan droid" as they are a tribute to Nyan Cat.
  - In 4.1 – 4.3.1 (Jelly Bean) a red jelly bean appears, which if pressed will show its face along with the OS version. If this jelly bean is then long-pressed, an interactive jelly bean mini-game will appear. This is where one can fling the jelly beans around. In 4.2 and above, another minor Easter egg is included: going to System > About Phone and continuously tapping the Build number section results in a notification stating "You are now a developer!", which enables the Developer Options screen. This Easter Egg is kept in all later versions.
  - In 4.4 (KitKat) a rotating letter "K" appears, which if continually tapped turns into the text "Android" in the styling of a KitKat logo. If the Android logo is then long-pressed or twisted with two fingers a tile interface, known as "a daydream" called "Dessert Case", loads with icons from all previous versions of Android. It appears to be a mock of the Windows Phone interface.
  - In 5.x (Lollipop) and 6.x (Marshmallow), a colored circle appears (or a circle with a stylized M inside in Marshmallow). If continuously tapped, it will turn into a lollipop with the text lollipop inside (or the M changes into a marshmallow in 6.x). Tapping the circle changes the color. When long-pressed, a game of Flappy Bird starts with the Android mascot instead. In Marshmallow, tapping the plus sign adds extra players (up to five), which can be controlled by the user or other players.
  - In 7.0 (Nougat), an "N" appears, which will enable another Easter egg if tapped. This Easter egg, titled "Android Neko" as a reference to the cat collecting mobile game Neko Atsume, can be accessed from the Quick Settings menu, and allows one to create virtual treats, which will eventually attract kittens. The kittens can be viewed in a gallery-style screen. Additionally, long-pressing on the aforementioned "N" repeatedly will alternate between displaying the no symbol and the cat face emojis, respectively toggling the Easter egg on and off. "No" and "cat" is a mondegreen for "nougat".
  - In 8.0 (Oreo), instead of the normal way of going to the Easter egg, heading to System > About Phone and tapping on the Android version repeatedly will launch the Easter egg. An orange circle appears, representing an "O" for Oreo. Long pressing on the center will open a blue screen representing a sea with an octopus floating around. The "O" in octopus represents Oreo while the eight legs on the octopus represent the version (8.0). The octopus can be moved by dragging the head around.
    - In 8.1, the orange O is replaced by an Oreo with an Android Mascot on it.
  - In 9.0 (Pie), the Easter egg is found by going to System > About Phone > Android version and then tapping three times on the Android version on the next screen. A white, extended "P" will then appear, usually with concentric colored circles disappearing into the "P". Each time the Easter egg is invoked, it displays different colors. The animation can be pinched to zoom.
    - On Google Pixel phones (that run 9.0 Pie), tapping the "P" icon several times will reveal a drawing app.
  - In 10.0 (Queen Cake), the text "android 10" will appear, where each of the texts "android", "1", and "0" can be moved and rotated. Rotating "1" and merging with the digit "0" will result in the "android Q" text. In this state, tapping the "Q" several times will reveal a Nonogram game, where the resulting pictures are various icons of Android.
  - In 11.0 (Red Velvet Cake), a dial will show up. It can only go up to 10. If a user turns it to the max three times, it will go up to 11. After this is done, a virtual cat Easter egg is unlocked. This one is also called "Android Neko", much like the Easter egg in Nougat releases.
  - In 12.0 (Snow Cone) and 13.0 (Tiramisu), a clock will show up. Setting it to the 12 o'clock position (or setting it to the 13 o'clock position in 13.0) will show many circles with the colors of Material You, resembling an Ishihara color test plate. This Easter egg may trigger Trypophobia in some users, as the spots are close together. After opening the Easter egg, a widget will be added to the list of available widget which, when tapped on, shows all the colors in the Material You color palette and tapping on one will open the share menu with details about the color. In 13.0, If one clicks on many circles, they will see different emojis.
  - In 14.0, 15.0, 16.0, and 17.0, the "Upside Down Cake" logo will pop up (or the "Vanilla Ice Cream" logo, the "Baklava" logo, or the "Cinnamon Bun" logo will pop up). If held long enough, along with the vibrations, a space-based game will appear. One can pilot a ship and discover planets in a system. With the release of Android 17, users are capable of connecting on-screen dots to form a circle, which allows them to launch the game.
- "Spells" may be "cast" on an Android phone by saying "Ok Google" followed by "Lumos" or "Nox" to turn the flashlight on and off, or "Silencio" to silence the ringer and notifications.

=== Android applications ===
- In the Google Play Games app, if the player swipes the Konami Code, a box will appear with three buttons – a B, an A and an ►. Pressing B then A then ► unlocks a secret achievement called "All your game are belong to us", a reference to the well known "All your base are belong to us" phrase.
- In the Google Phone (Dialer) app, inputting the "Emergency Number" "0118 999 881 999 119 725 3", advertised to replace "999" in The IT Crowd's season 1 episode "Calamity Jen", will cause the phone to vibrate and the call button to flash blue and red. The feature is supported to work on stock Android Marshmallow and Android Nougat, and is still present on Oreo (8.1) devices.
- On YouTube Creator Studio, swiping down the screen repeatedly will show a cat at the top of the screen.
- Entering the tabview on the Google Chrome app and swiping up on a tab five times will cause the tab to do a backflip.
- Opening more than 99 tabs in the Google Chrome app will result in ":D" shown instead of the number of opened tabs. In incognito tab it will show ";)".
- Tapping on the dinosaur, which is shown if the Google Chrome app is not able to connect to internet, will start Dinosaur Game.

=== Gallery ===
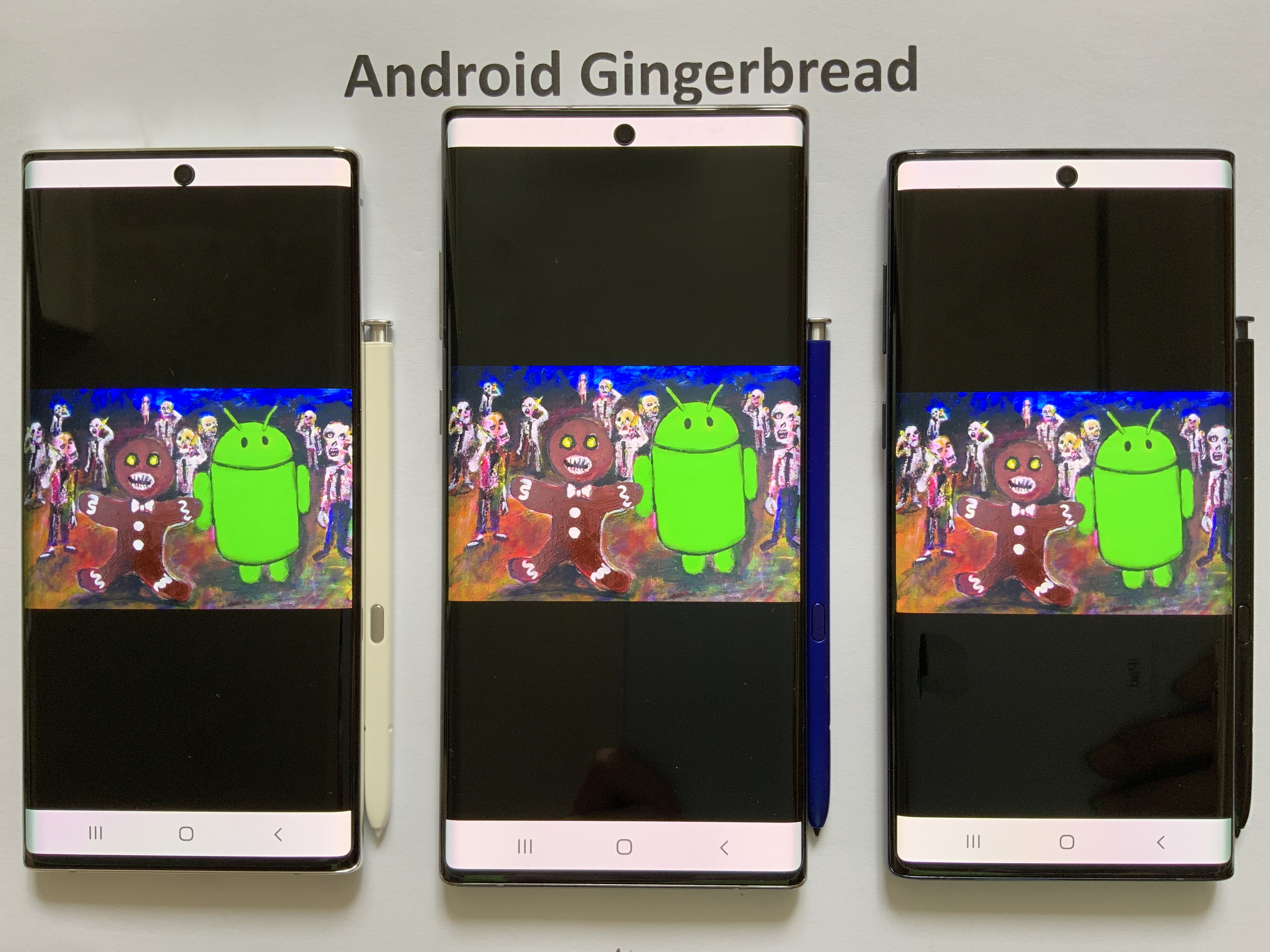
Gingerbread

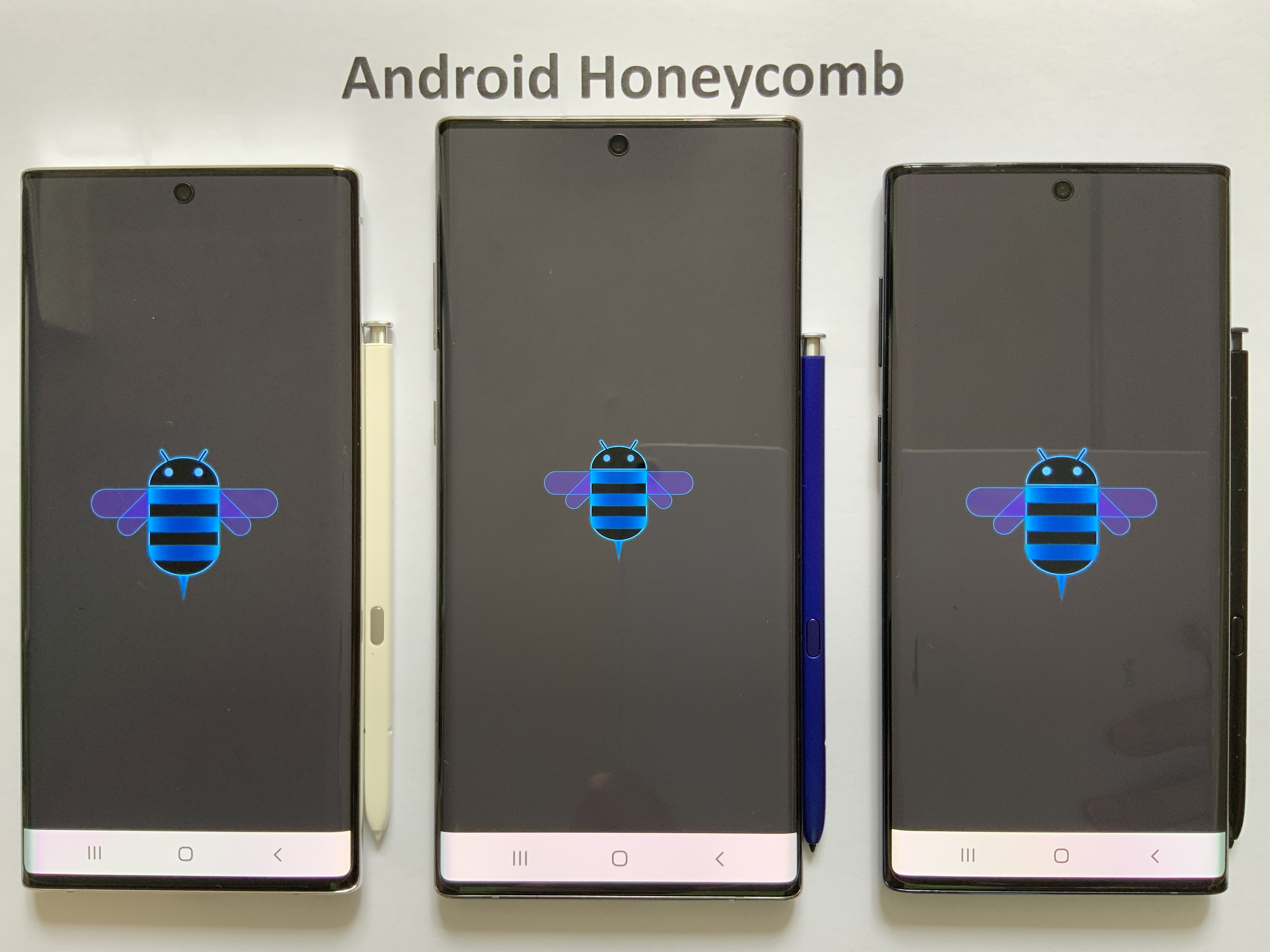
Honeycomb

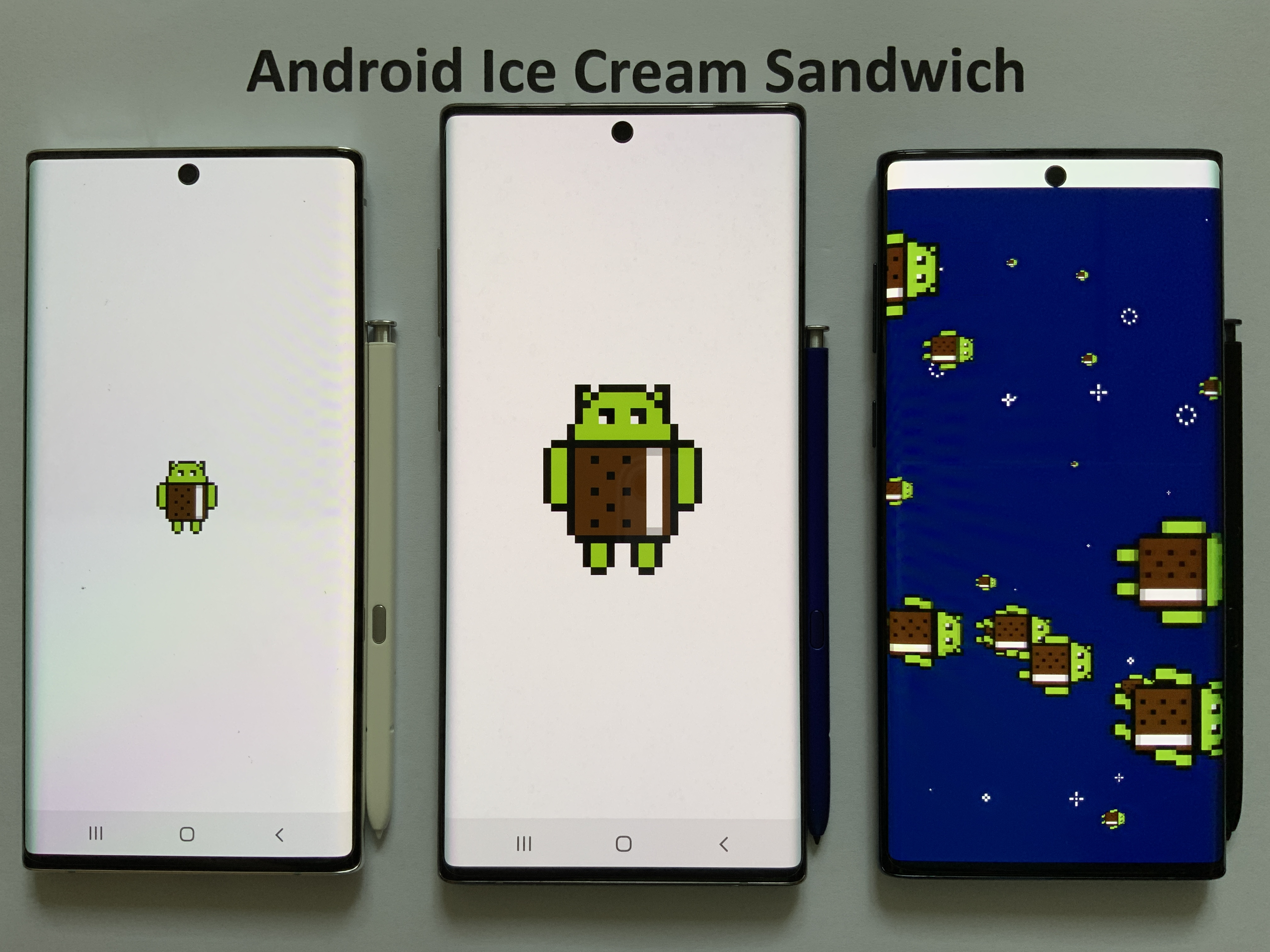
Ice Cream Sandwich

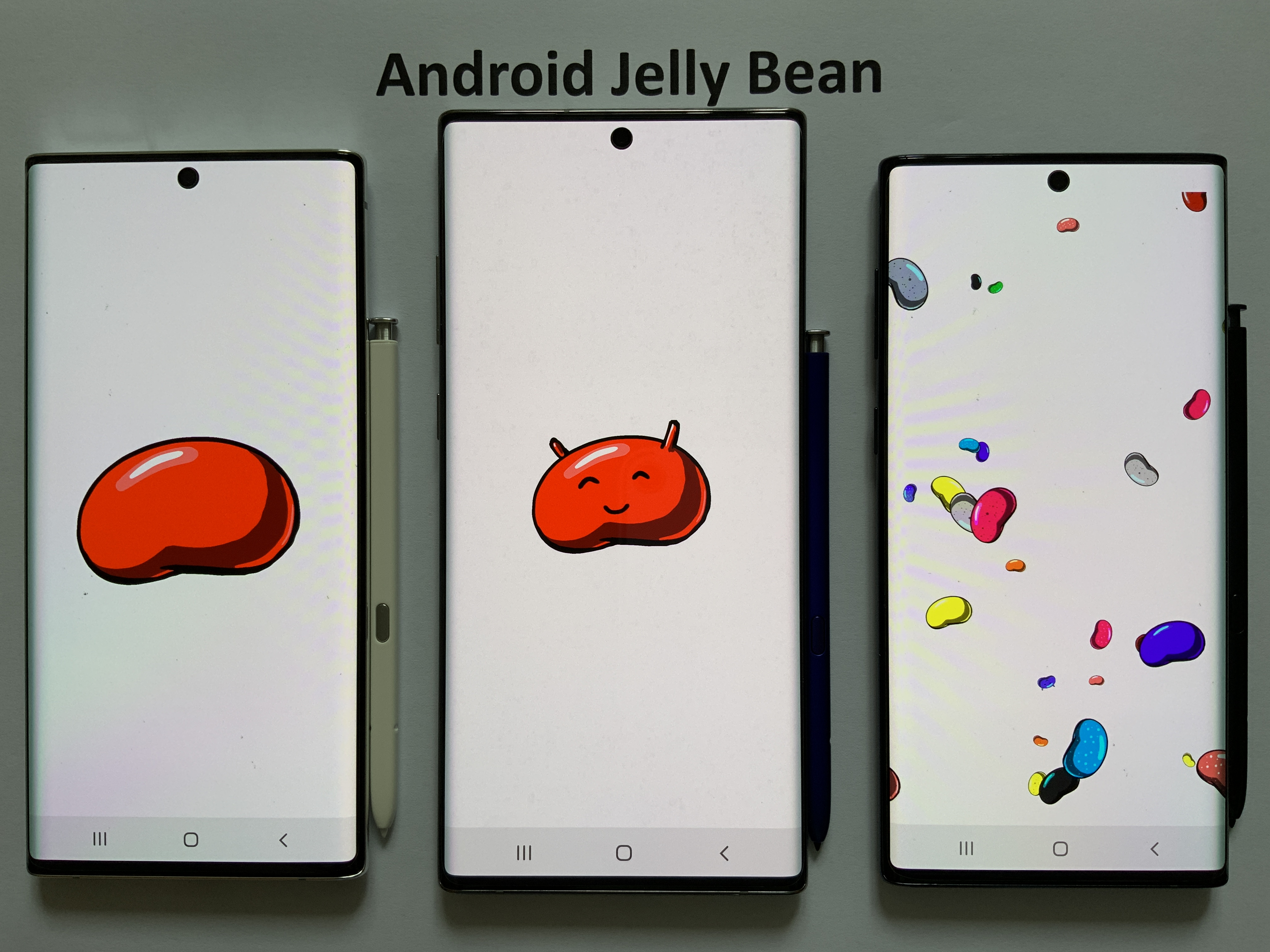
Jelly Bean

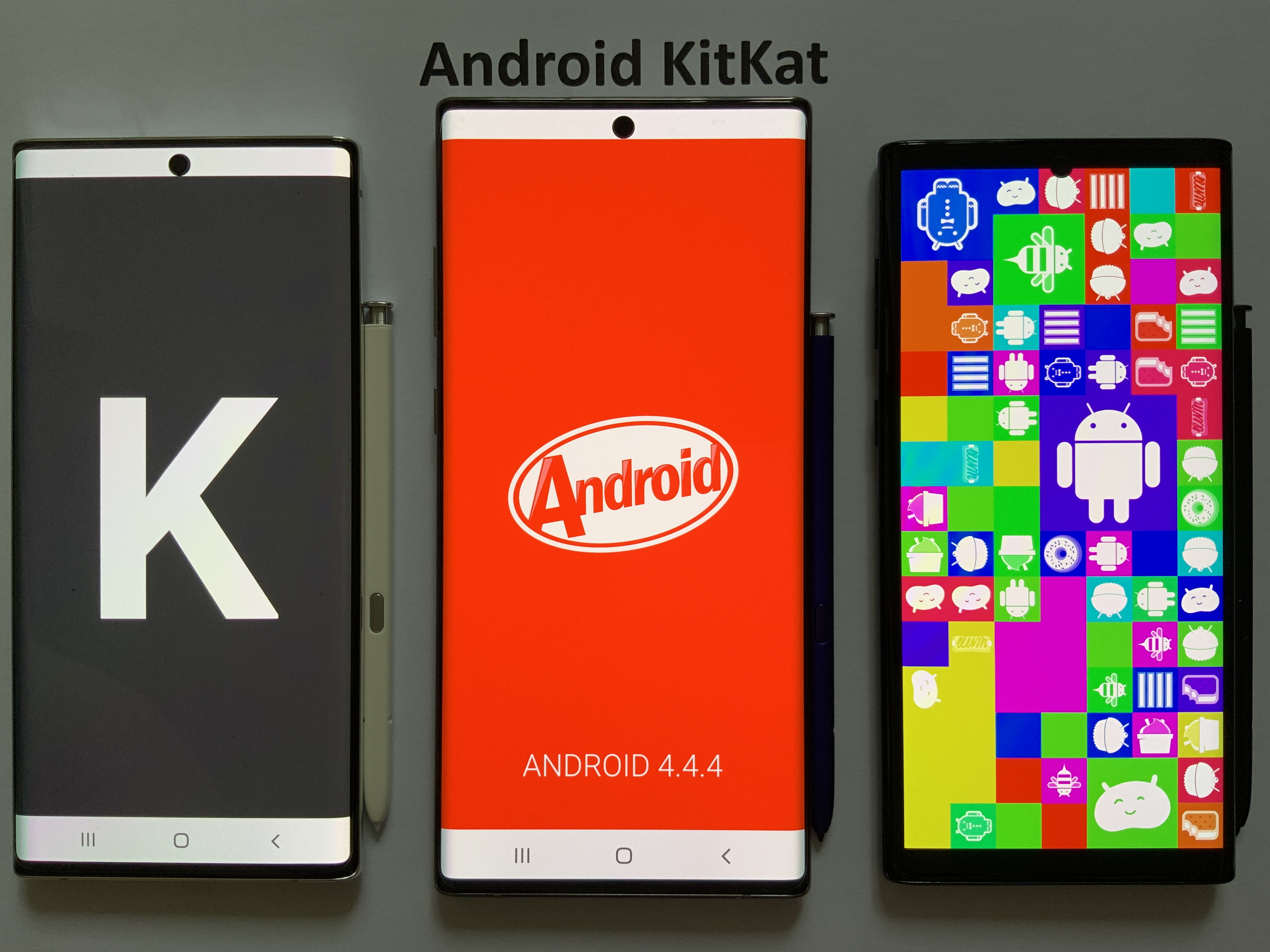
KitKat

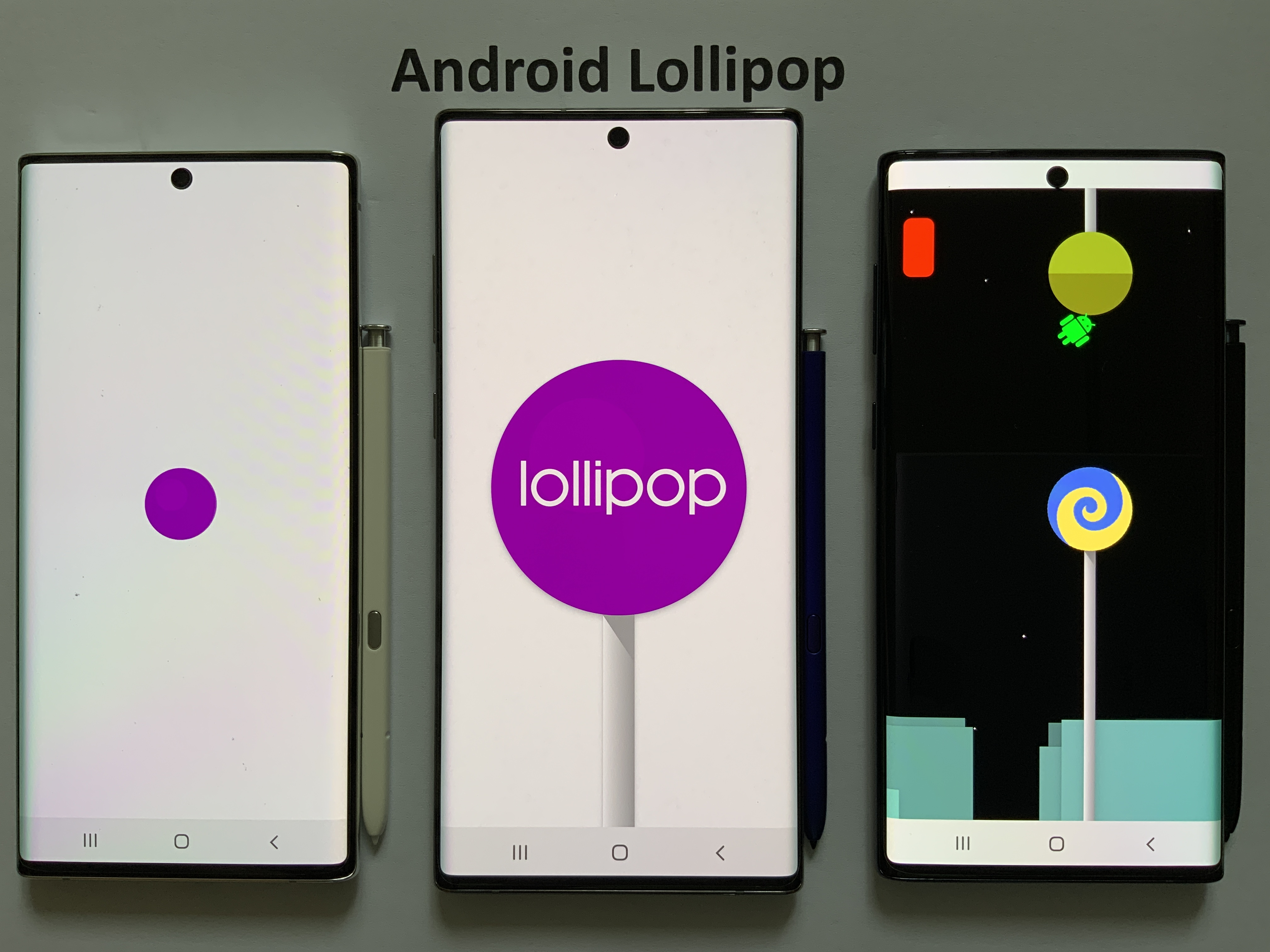
Lollipop

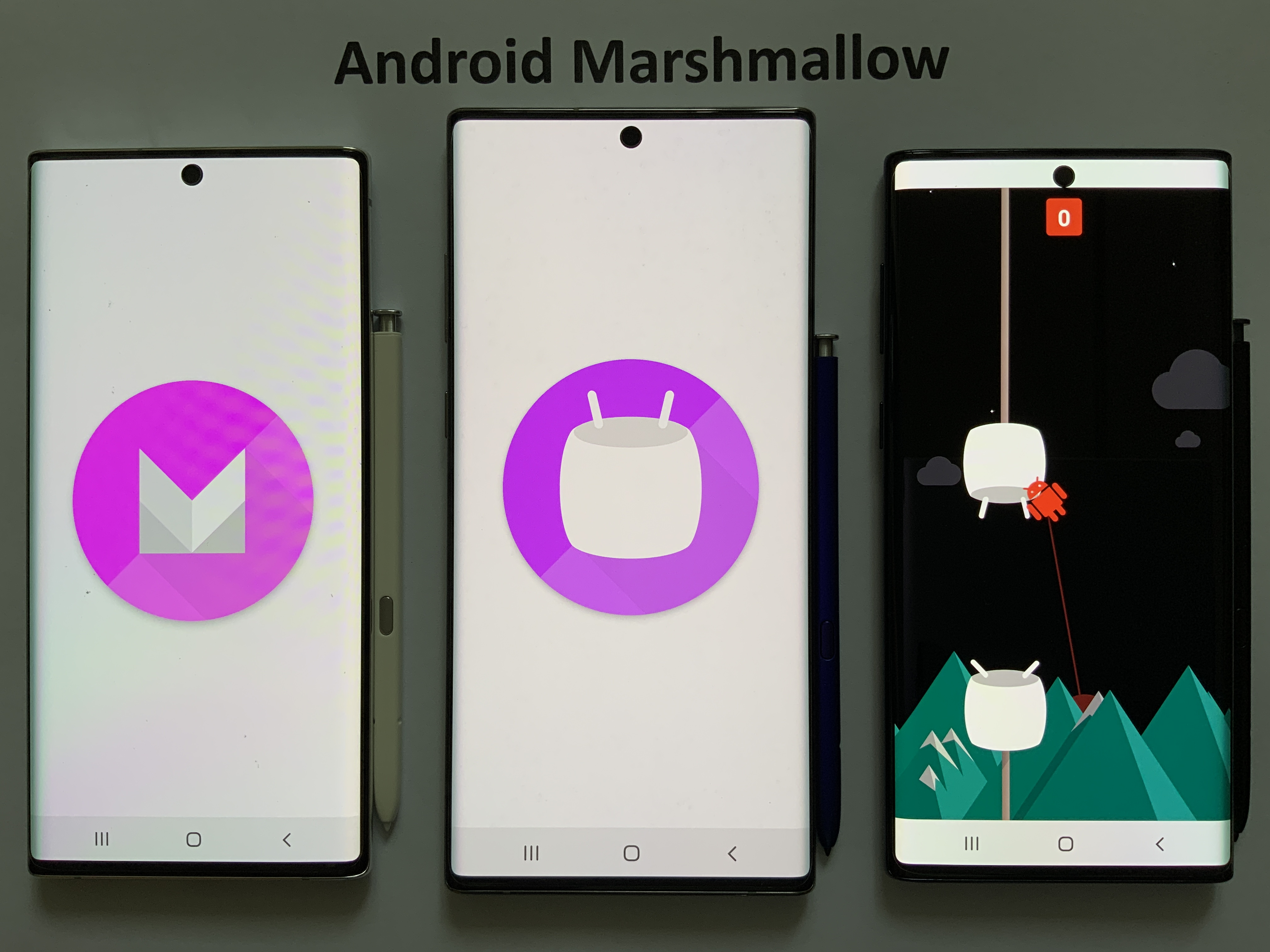
Marshmallow

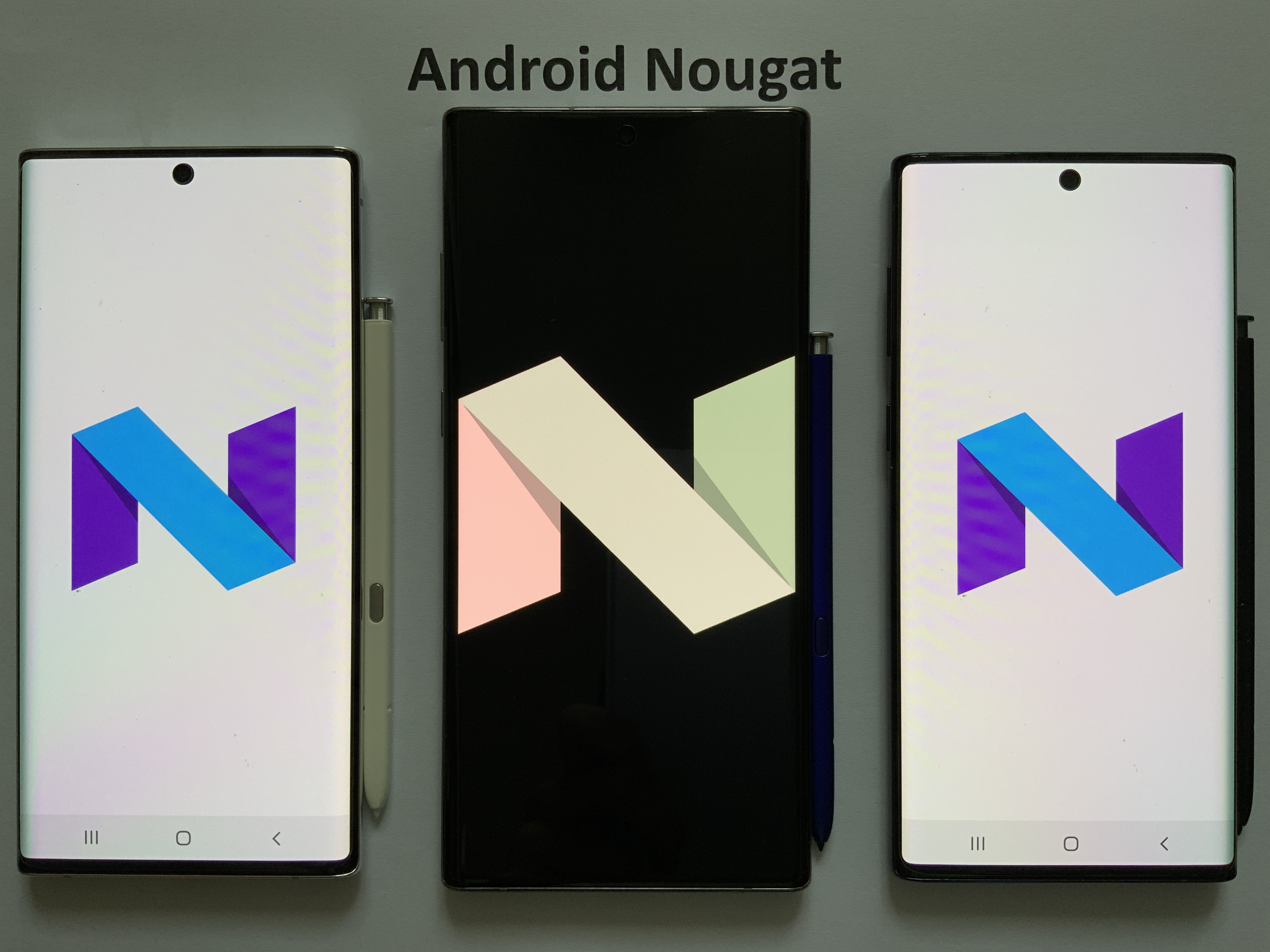
Nougat

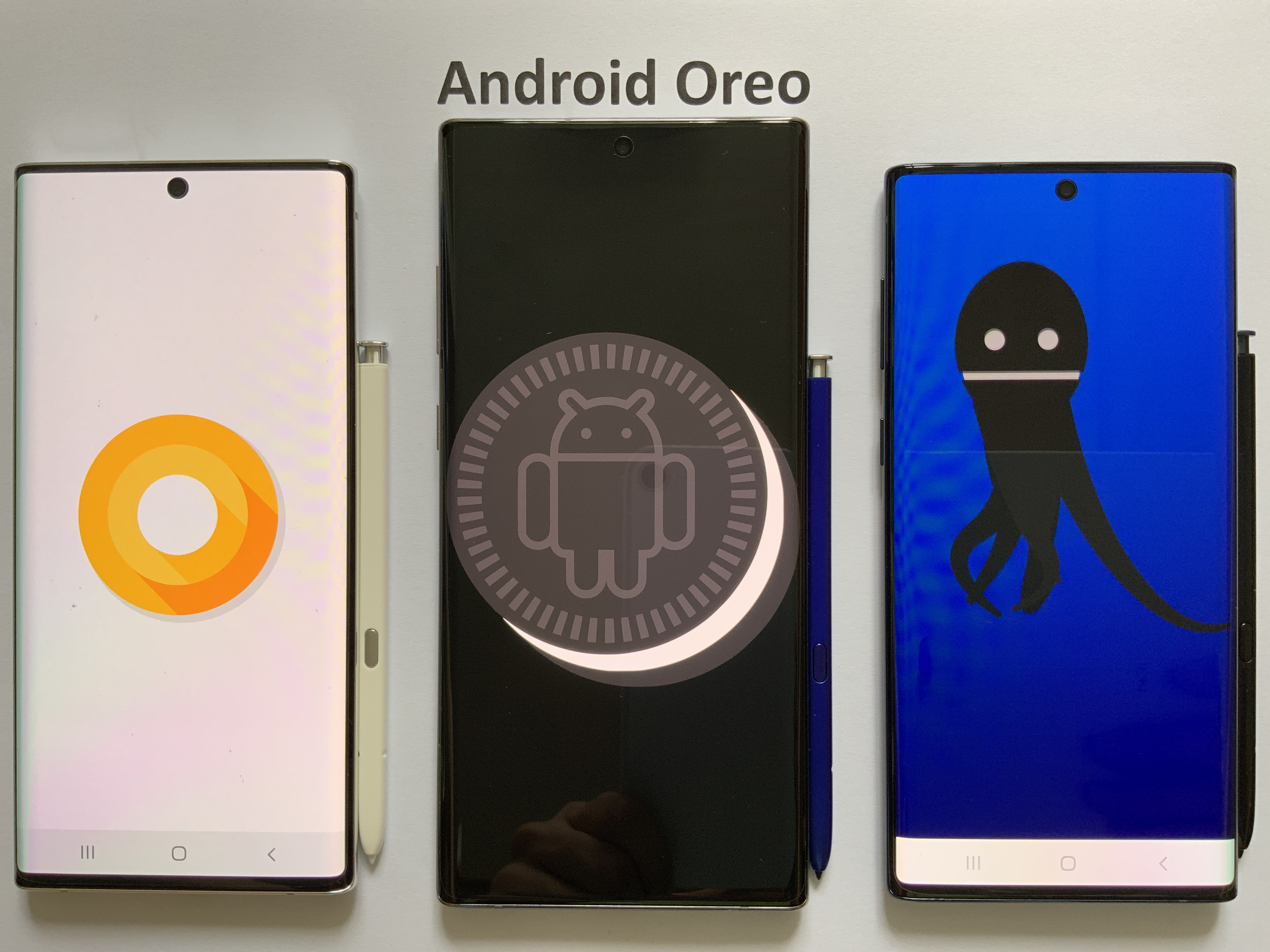
Oreo

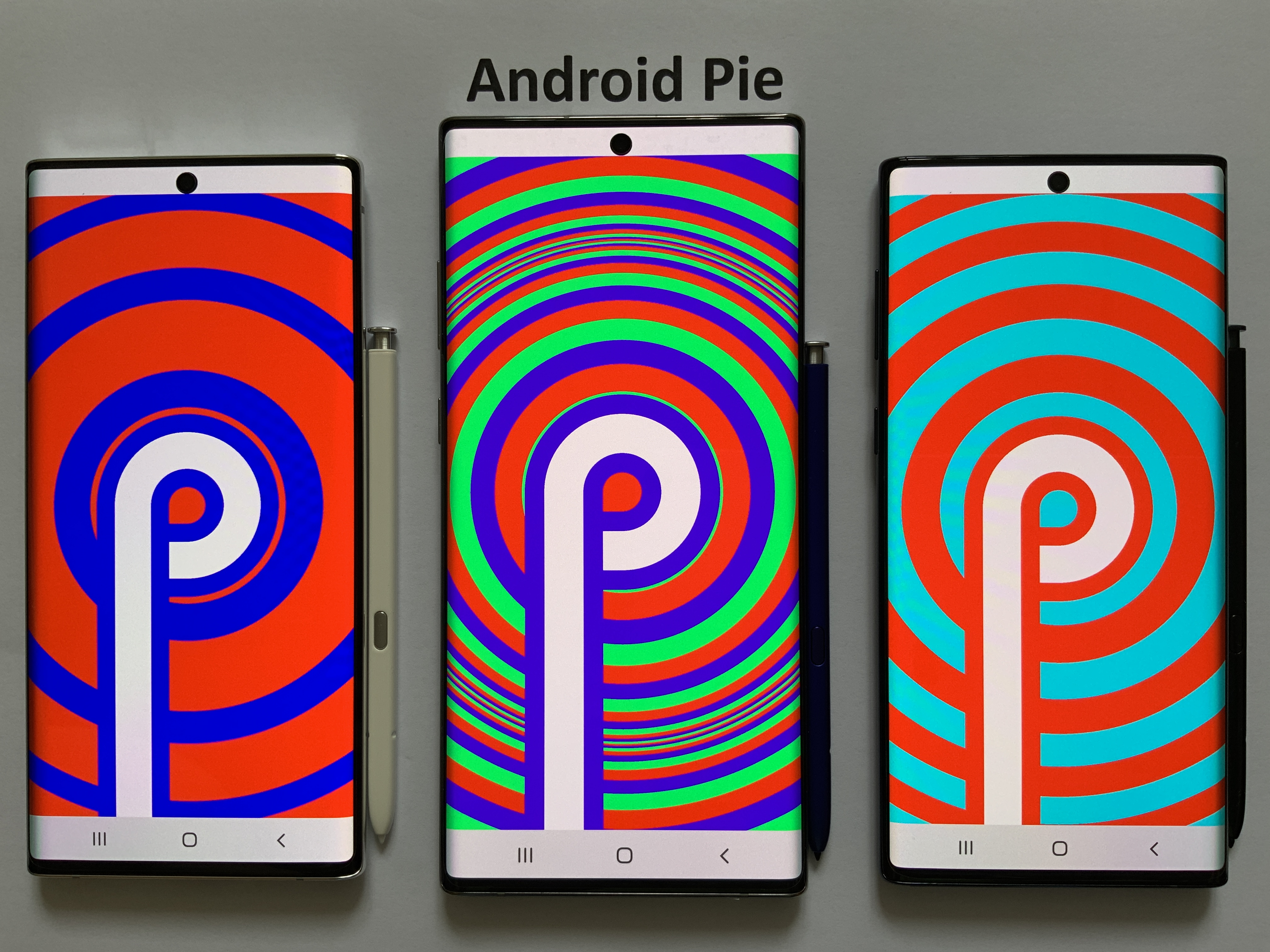
Pie

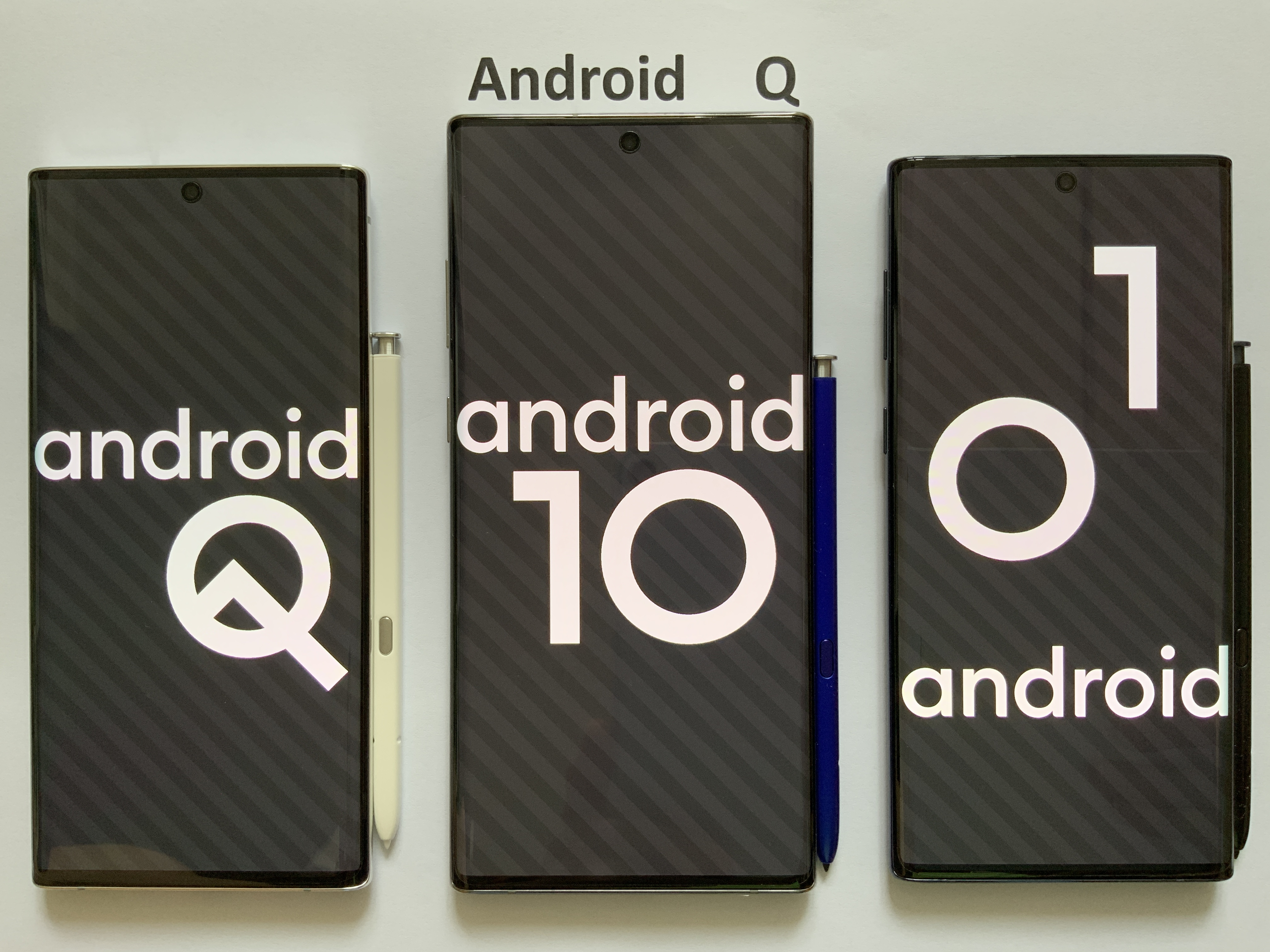
Queen Cake

== YouTube ==
- When liking a video at exactly 67 likes, confetti drops down and a message comes down saying "🤷‍♂️ six seven", referencing the 6-7 internet meme.
- When searching videos related to Taylor Swift's 2025 album The Life of a Showgirl, the progress bar displays a golden door.
  - Videos on her official channel would have a hand heart as the progress bar if one watched them on her 35th birthday, December 13, 2024. This worked on PC, YouTube TV, and Android.
- On a video published by Numberphile on June 22, 2012, titled "Why do YouTube views freeze at 301?", the view count is intentionally frozen at 301, referencing a bug that prevented the view counter from refreshing beyond 301 views.
- Adding "&wadsworth=1" to a video URL would apply "Wadsworth's constant", skipping the first third of the video.
- While viewing any video, typing "awesome" makes the progress bar and other player elements flash multicolored. Typing "awesome" again stops it. For some reason, this Easter Egg currently seems to be glitched.
- YouTube's robots.txt file at "www.youtube.com/robots.txt" states that it was "Created in the distant future (the year 2000) after the robotic uprising of the mid 1990s which wiped out all humans." This is an ostensible reference to the song "Robots" by Flight of the Conchords.
- In December 2011, a button was added that would overlay a falling snow effect over most videos.
- The title for Adult Swim's "Too Many Cooks" short on YouTube is displayed in the same font and color as the title cards in the video.
- During the Happy YouTube Anniversary event in 2025, watching the first video ever published to the site, "Me at the zoo", showed a cake instead of a red rewind point.
- On videos from Olivia Rodrigo, the progress bar displays a ball of yarn and two knitting needles, as a reference to her 2026 album You Seem Pretty Sad for a Girl So in Love.
- On videos by the official channel for Lisa, the progress bar will be hot pink and have a yellow-colored lily on it.

=== YouTube search ===
A YouTube search for:

- "technoblade" will cause a prompt to show up under the search bar, which reads: "Did you mean: technoblade never dies" in tribute to the popular Minecraft YouTuber who died in June 2022.
- "seinfeld without people" will show a titleless and descriptionless video about an episode of Seinfeld without any cast members.

== Chrome ==
Lonely T-Rex

- If one tries to browse when offline, a message is shown that they are not connected to the Internet. An illustration of the "Lonely T-Rex" dinosaur is shown at the top, which blinks occasionally, designed by Sebastien Gabriel. From September 2014, tapping the dinosaur (in Android or iOS) or pressing space or ↑ (on desktop) launches a browser game known as the Dinosaur Game in which the player controls a running dinosaur by tapping the screen (in Android or iOS) or pressing space, ↑ or ↓ (on desktop) to avoid obstacles, including cacti and, from June 2015, pterodactyls. In 2016, another feature was added to the game. When the player reaches 700 points the game begins to switch between day (white background, black lines and shapes) and night (black background, white lines and shapes). During September 2018, for Google Chrome's 10th birthday, a birthday cake causing the dinosaur to wear a birthday hat when collected was added. Reaching a score of 900 will switch the color scheme back to day, and the switch back and forth will occur at further subsequent milestones. The game is also available at the "chrome://network-error/-106" and "chrome://dino" pages. The game's code is available on the Chromium site.

=== ChromeOS ===
A user's cursor demonstrating the ChromeOS logo easter egg on the system's settings.

- In the Camera app, activating caps lock and typing "CRAZYPONY" would open the files app and prompt the user to select a video file. Users could then add filters and take screenshots of the video. However, this Easter egg might not work for all Chromebooks.
- The keyboard shortcut ctrl+alt+⇧ Shift+refresh causes the current window to spin (Barrel Roll). If the user has multiple tabs open in separate windows, only the current window the user is using will spin.
- Inputting the Konami Code on a Chromebook Pixel causes the lights on an LED strip on the lid of the computer to blink rapidly.
- When a file has "Google_logo" on its name, the "Google_logo" text will replace with a Google logo.
- Clicking on the Google Chrome logo as shown on the system's About ChromeOS settings causes the logo to spin.

== Other ==
"PRIDE" Easter Egg in Google Sheets being demonstrated

- Navigating to a 404 page on google.com will result with the title the webpage having a 1 instead of an ! in "Error 404 (Not Found)!!1". This is most likely part of the "!1 Phenomenon".
- Pressing Ctrl+⇧ Shift+Y in the Picasa desktop application will cause a teddy bear to appear on the screen. Note that the Picasa application no longer exists, as it was replaced by Google Photos.
- In Google Glass, tapping Settings → Device info → View licenses, then tapping the touchpad 9 times, will show a Tap Meet Team option. Tapping again will show a photo of the Google Glass development team.
- Any photograph with Christmas lights uploaded to Google+ would have been turned into an animated GIF, showing sparkling lights.
- On the Google Play Store, clicking the search button with a blank search field will search "unicorns".
- In Google's iPhone and iPod touch search application, swiping downwards (past About) repeatedly in the Settings interface brings up a hidden menu item, called Bells and Whistles, allowing customization of colors, sounds and more within the app.
- The model numbers for the first generation Chromecast unit and its power adapter read H2G2-42 and MST3K-US, respectively.
- The password for Google Fi Wireless data only SIM cards is "h2g2", another reference to The Hitchhiker's Guide to the Galaxy.
- In Google Sheets, as to celebrate LGBT pride, typing "PRIDE" in cells A1-E1 with each individual letter in each cell will change the fill color of columns to make a rainbow. As of an unknown date the colors were changed to the colors that were seen in every pride flag.
- On the iOS app of Google, opening the tabs page and scrolling down will open a pinball game.
- Creating a new Google Form and naming the title "(╯°□°）╯︵ ┻━┻" will cause a "table-flipping" animation where the form and top bar of the website spin 360 degrees (similar to Google's "do a barrel roll") and the title will be changed to a version of the kaomoji sitting contently with the table flipped (shown on right). "┬─┬ ノ( ゜-゜ノ)"

== Former Easter eggs ==
=== General ===
The following have since been removed as of November 15, 2026:

- "2/22/22" or "twosday" would make confetti appear with number 2's and a phrase saying "Happy Twosday 2You!" on February 22, 2022.
- "a long time ago in a galaxy far far away" resulted in the same tilted, scrolling style that the introductions to the original Star Wars movies were presented in. This included the music, which was muted but could be heard by clicking on or selecting the muted speaker icon on the page. This was discontinued on June 28, 2017.
- "ascii art" showed the logo as if it were created with ASCII characters.
- "baby yoda", "grogu", "the child", "the mandalorian", or "din grogu" brought up a Grogu (Baby Yoda) image button on the bottom right corner of the screen; when pressed, Grogu would use the force to pull off a result and throw it to the bottom of the screen. It was possible to press the button multiple times to remove more results. As of October 2, 2024, this has been discontinued.
- "barbie", "ryan gosling", or "margot robbie" or "gerta gerwig" would show little rose fireworks and the interface and phone screen would then change to a rose color, in promotion for the 2023 Barbie film. This has been discontinued as of November 1, 2026.
- "binary", "hex", "hexadecimal", and "octal" showed the number of search results in the respective numeral system. This has since been discontinued.
- "chappell roan" would show "Did you mean: your favorite artist's favorite artist", and vice versa when searching "your favorite artist's favorite artist". This is in reference to Roan famously shouting the phrase during her 2024 Coachella performance, and its subsequent viral usage on social media platforms like TikTok. The quote is inspired by American drag queen Sasha Colby's own saying "I'm your favorite drag queen's favorite drag queen".
- "cicada" and similar terms added a cicada that, when pressed, showed some cicadas flying over the screen.
- "connections" would make a purple button with the NYT Connections logo pop up at the bottom, which would release confetti and Connections images from the top of the screen.
- "cricket world cup" or "2023 cricket world cup" showed a minigame titled Mini Cup which allowed selections from the various teams participating in the 13th edition of the Cricket World Cup. The game featured batting with a tally of the teams having the highest scores.
- "david attenborough" showed a cupcake button which, when clicked, brought up several animals carrying cupcakes and presents, alongside a "Thank you" message, turning the entire page into a wildlife scenery. This was made to honor Attenborough's 100th birthday, though it has been removed as of November 2, 2026.
- "easter" would change the "Gooo...gle" page indicator at the bottom of every result page to show Easter eggs instead of "o"s.
- "erling haaland" made seven animated Vikings rowing a longboat to scroll at the bottom of the page, which referenced the number of goals the Norwegian footballer had scored during the 2026 FIFA World Cup. This was accompanied by the sound of the drumbeat and shouting of the Norwegian word for "row" ("ro") from the Viking Row chant associated with the tournament, which played every time the confetti button is clicked. This easter egg seems to have been removed after the World Cup.
- "elden ring" made the phrase "⚔️ Arise again, Ye Tarnished ⚔️" drag across the screen.
- "fifa" and "world cup", during FIFA World Cup 2010, caused the "Goooo...gle" page indicator at the bottom of every result page to read "Goooo...al!" instead; this was discontinued after the World Cup.
- "five nights at freddy's" and similar terms would have caused Toy Freddy's eyes to appear on the screen, look left and right, and then disappear. Searching for Mangle or Toy Bonnie would result in the eyes instead having yellow or green irides, respectively. This was to promote the release of the 2025 film Five Nights at Freddy's 2; it has been discontinued by March 2026.
- "2026 fifa world cup", "world cup" and similar searches will display red, yellow and white fireworks for several seconds, as Spain won that edition of the World Cup; this was discontinued after the World Cup.
- "indian premier league" or "ipl" would display yellow and blue fireworks in celebration of Chennai Super Kings victory over Kolkata Knight Riders during the 2021 Indian Premier League; this was discontinued on October 30, 2021.
- "infinite craft" used to bring up the words "🌊 Lake + 🛰️ Satellite" above the results. In the game, combining the two will create "🔍 Google". This has since been removed.
- "jawan" or "shah rukh khan" showed a walkie talkie which clicked, would cover the screen with bandages and play an audio of Indian actor Shah Rukh Khan speaking "ready"; referencing his role as the vigilante character in the 2023 film.
- "j dilla" or "jay dee" would show a button with the symbol of a doughnut, referencing Dilla's last album Donuts. When clicked, sprinkles and doughnuts would rain the page to honor The Art of Hip-Hop Beat Making. Each doughnut is likely separated into pieces to symbolize Dilla's quantization for drums and his unique style of chopping.
- "lunar new year", "chinese new year", or "year of the rabbit" caused fireworks to shoot up in the search page. Occasionally, a firework formed a rabbit silhouette; this was made to celebrate the Year of the Rabbit in Lunar New Year in 2023, this was discontinued as of November 3, 2026.
- "nothing beats a jet2 holiday" or "jess glynne hold my hand" would result in a plane emoji flying through the top-left corner and the words "...and right now, you can save 50£ per person. That's 200£ off for a family of four!" would scroll above the results, a reference to Jet2holidays and their frequent usage of "Hold My Hand" in their adverts, which became a viral meme. This easter egg has been removed as of November 3, 2026.
- "rat czar" caused a rat emoji and a crown emoji to move across the search results, as a reference to New York City's appointed director of rodent mitigation, referred to as the "Rat Czar"; this was removed as of August 28, 2024.
- "shaboozey", "tipsy", or any query that brought up the Knowledge Graph for "A Bar Song (Tipsy)" would cause the page to tip once left and right.
- "snoop dogg" showed the top scrolled emojis of a badminton racket and ball along with a comment by American rapper Snoop Dogg at the NBC during the 2024 Summer Olympic Games in Paris; this was discontinued after the Olympics.
- "superb owl" around the time of the Super Bowl showed a Knowledge Graph for the Super Bowl, along with a games' information panel titled "Superb owl" with an image of an owl wearing a crown, in response to an ongoing joke amongst Redditors about the common misspelling of "Super Bowl".
- Between June and July 2025, "the tiny chef show" (or simply "tiny chef") had "💐 It's going to be blokay 💐" scrolling across the screen, in response to the show's viral cancellation.
  - From November 26–30, it resulted in a small green circle popping up at the bottom of the screen with a camera. Upon clicking it, it popped up with a photo of Tiny Chef at Google with a note that said "Tiny Chef paid a visit to google!"
- "wicked", "elphaba", "glinda", "galinda", "ariana grande", "cynthia erivo", and "defying gravity" showed a green witch hat button which, when clicked, would unleash some green smoke and pink bubbles (representing Elphaba and Glinda) and make the search results float up to the top of the screen while the film version of "Defying Gravity" was playing in the background; as part of the release of the 2024 Wicked movie.
- "winter olympics", "olympics", "milano cortina", or anything related to the 2026 Winter Olympics would show a wolfdog running across the screen, in reference to Nazgul, a wolfdog who ran to the finish line in the cross-country sprint finals; this was discontinued after the Olympics.
- "wonderwall" or any lyrics related to the Oasis song showed a button which, when clicked, would sing the "cause maybe..." part in a loop until one stopped the audio and visuals by clicking the button again.
- "zerg rush" caused an army of Google "O"s to attack and destroy the search results, which could be defeated by clicking on them. Once one got defeated (as victory is impossible), the "O"s formed two "G"s (GG), meaning "Good Game". This appears to have been discontinued.
- "pluribus" would show the message "What are you searching for, Carol?" scrolling across the top of the page, written in the style of a message from the show's fictional hive-mind to the protagonist, Carol.

==== Knowledge Graph ====
- "gotham city", "batman", or "bruce wayne" would show the Bat-Signal next to the results. Tapping or clicking it showed a stormy night background on the search results, along with the glowing bat signal overlaid on top. After a few seconds, one would hear a grappling sound before seeing the shadow of Batman swinging across the screen. This was in honor of the release of The Batman in 2022, but was later removed in March 2023.
- "thanos" and "infinity gauntlet" displayed a Knowledge Graph with the Infinity Gauntlet on it. Clicking it would cause its fingers to snap, disintegrating half of the links and images on the page, as well as counting down the number of results to half. This is a reference to Avengers: Infinity War, in which Thanos destroyed half of all life in the universe with the Gauntlet by snapping his fingers, and was added in celebration of its sequel, Avengers: Endgame. Clicking the gauntlet again restored the previously disintegrated results' content. This was removed as of 2020.
- "wizard of oz" would display a pair of ruby slippers in the Knowledge Graph. Clicking on them caused the page to spin in a tornado-like effect while an audio file of Judy Garland saying "There's no place like home" was heard. After the effect finished, the page would be seen in a sepia tone only. If the tornado was clicked, an audio file from the movie when the tornado hits would play, and the page would spin again and return to color.

==== Image search ====
- A Google image search for "atari breakout" or just "breakout" would start a game of Breakout, using the gallery of image results as bricks. Once the bricks were destroyed, a random phrase was automatically searched, the player would get an extra ball, and the game restarted. This was added in 2013 in celebration of the 37th anniversary of the original Atari game until May 2020.

=== Google Subpages ===
- "www.google.com/killer-robots.txt" was a plain text file in robots.txt format that instructed the Terminator not to kill the company founders Larry Page and Sergey Brin, but has since been removed.

=== Android Applications ===
- In Google+, if the device was shaken while viewing a photo, snow would fall; if the device was shaken again it would save an animated GIF of the image with falling snow to the pictures directory. Note that Google+ no longer exists, as it was replaced with a now defunct social app called Google Currents in 2019 after its shutdown.
- Searching for "let's go caroling" or "let's go carolling" on Google Now resulted in an extra card which displayed a list of Christmas carols. The phone would play the music and show the words if one of them was selected. This was removed as Google Now was discontinued.

=== YouTube ===
- On YouTube for PlayStation 4, Xbox One, Nintendo Switch and on YouTube TV, holding rewind (left on a gamepad thumbstick, left ← or J on a keyboard) for a few seconds while at the beginning of a video, would cause an animated image of a small dog to run across the video's progress bar.
- On December 12, 2015, in celebration of the release of Star Wars: The Force Awakens, the progress bar was changed in order to look like a Lightsaber. By signing up to a specially created page, users were able to follow the Light Side (which would change the progress bar to blue) or the Dark Side (which would change the progress bar to red). Account users had the option to return the effect to normal. Google later disabled it on February 1, 2016.
- A Snake game could be activated in the Adobe Flash player by pressing a combination of arrow keys while videos were paused or playing. Once started, the snake could be controlled by further use of the arrow keys, directing it to "gobble up dots" to increase its size. If the snake hit the edges of the video window, the game would end. This feature no longer works with the HTML video player, more so with Flash's discontinuation.
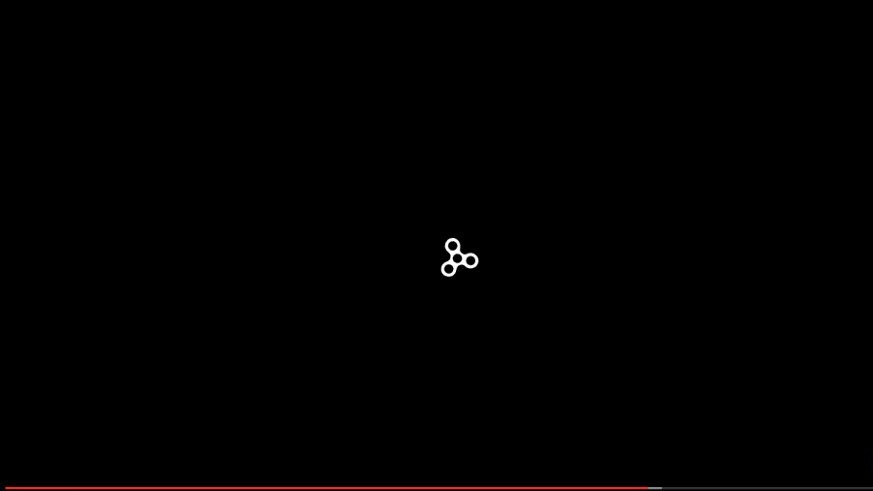
  The Fidget Spinner that replaces the buffering icon
- When watching a video with "fidget spinner" in the title, the buffering icon would change into a spinning fidget spinner.
- In 2011, the Nyan Cat video on YouTube was updated to show a custom progress bar with the titular cat on a rainbow trail; this was later removed at an unknown date.
- On videos related to the 2026 FIFA World Cup, the progress bar displays a soccer ball; this was discontinued after the World Cup.

==== YouTube Search ====
- "beam me up scotty" would cause the search results to beam down onto the screen, referencing Star Trek.
- "doge meme" changed the font on the search result page to pastel color Comic Sans typical of the Doge meme, but has since been removed.
- "do the harlem shake" would cause the Harlem Shake song to play and the results to dance along to the music.
- "use the force luke" caused the results to levitate, as if by the Force mentioned in Star Wars.
- "webdriver torso" would return the results but with a red background and a blue rectangle around some videos. It also said "aqua.flv – Slide 000[0–9]" at the bottom left of the page. Google has confirmed that this was a reference to the Webdriver Torso mystery; one of many test channels used by YouTube to ensure video quality.

== See also ==
- elgooG – a mirrored website of Google Search with horizontally flipped search results within which one can play some Google Easter eggs which were discontinued.
- Intelligence Quotient (IQ) and Browser Usage – a hoax study that claimed to have correlated the IQs of 100,000 internet users with which web browsers they used, claiming that users of Microsoft's Internet Explorer had lower IQs than users of other browsers
- List of Easter eggs in Microsoft products
- List of Easter eggs in Tesla products
