= ElgooG =

Mirrored website of Google Search

elgooG

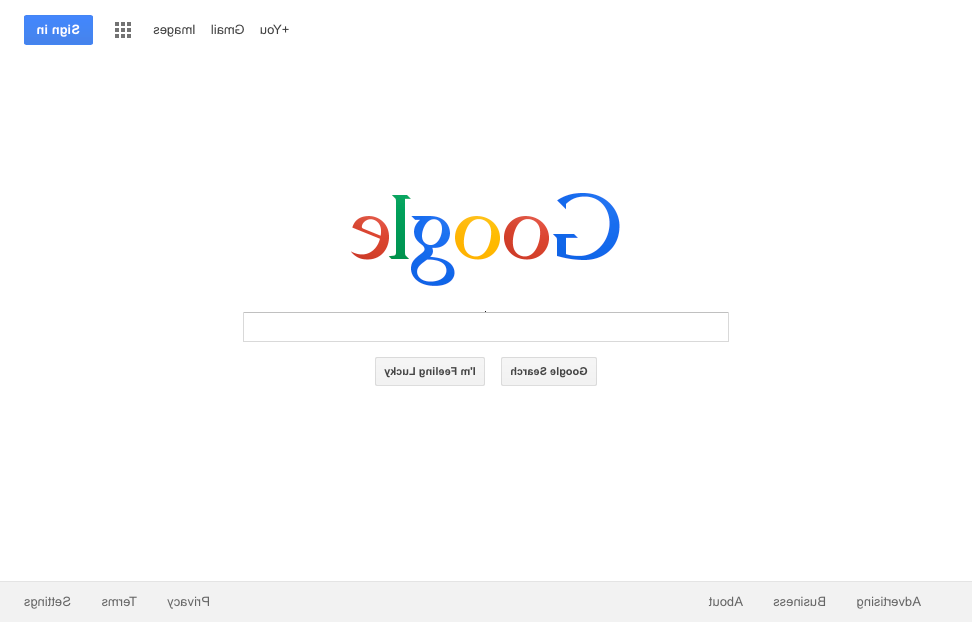
- Screenshot elgooG's homepage
- Website type: Search engine
- Available in: English
- Website: elgoog.im
- Launched: 2002; 24 years ago
- Current status: Active

elgooG is the word Google spelled backwards. It has been used in the URL of an unofficial joke mirror site of Google Search, which allowed users from Mainland China to bypass the Great Firewall. The website is also used to display different official and unofficial Google easter eggs, including ones removed by Google.

== History ==
The first usage of the term comes from a Google mirror site created by All Too Flat, a website dedicated to "useless information and the promotion of laughter". It accepted queries and provided search results that were spelled in reverse alphabetical order.

elgooG was not officially affiliated with Google, although the domain elgoog.com is owned by Google LLC as of March 8, 2026. Its creators asked Google for permission to sell elgooG merchandise to cover bandwidth costs but were refused.

elgooG gained popularity in 2002 because it could still be accessed from mainland China through the Great Firewall even after the government blocked search engines such as AltaVista and Google, although the mirror site did not have support for Chinese characters.

On April 8, 2015, Google created an official mirrored version of Google Search for April Fools' Day with com.google. The site was the company's first ever use of the .google top-level domain.

== See also ==
- List of Google Easter eggs
