= Susan Lindauer =

American antiwar activist (born 1963)

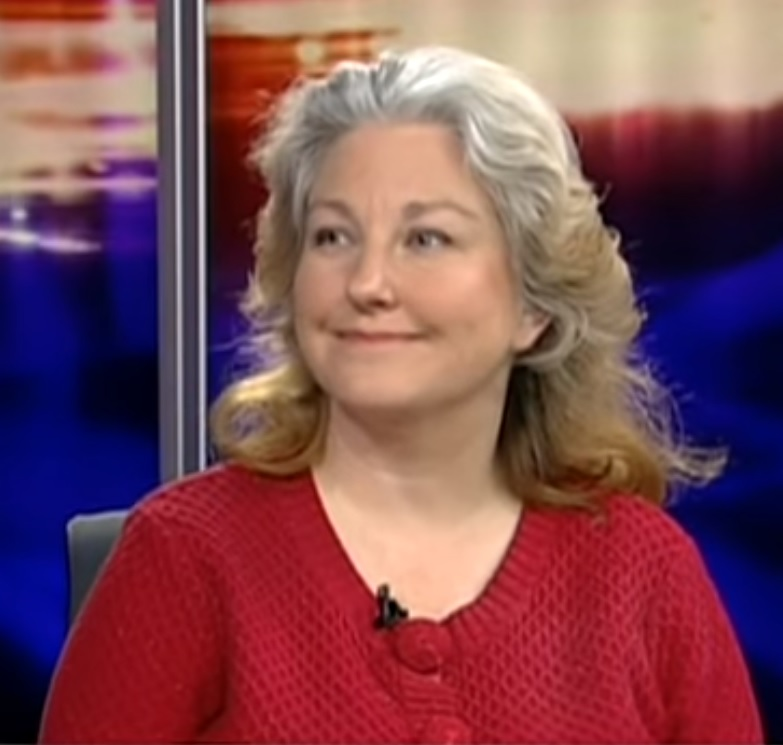
- Lindauer on RT America in 2011
- Born: July 17, 1963 (age 63)
- Occupations: Author, journalist, activist, former U.S. Congressional staffer
- Parent(s): John Howard Lindauer; Jackie Lindauer (1932–1992)

Susan Lindauer (born July 17, 1963) is an American journalist and former U.S. Congressional staffer who was charged with "acting as an unregistered agent of a foreign government" and violating U.S. financial sanctions during the run-up to the 2003 invasion of Iraq. She was incarcerated in 2005 and released the next year after two judges ruled her mentally unfit to stand trial. The government dropped the prosecution in 2009. In 2010, Lindauer published a book about her experiences. Since 2011 Lindauer has appeared frequently on television and in print as a U.S. government critic.

== Early life and education ==
Lindauer is the daughter of John Howard Lindauer II, a newspaper publisher and former Republican nominee for Governor of Alaska. Her mother, Jacqueline "Jackie" Shelly Lindauer, died of cancer in 1992. In 1995, her father married Dorothy Oremus, a Chicago attorney.

Lindauer attended East Anchorage High School in Anchorage, Alaska, where she was an honor student and was in school plays. She graduated from Smith College in 1985 and then earned a master's degree in public policy from the London School of Economics.

== Career ==
Lindauer began in journalism working as a temporary reporter at the Seattle Post-Intelligencer in 1987, and as an editorial writer at The Everett Herald in Everett, Washington until 1989. She later worked as a reporter and researcher at U.S. News & World Report in 1990 and 1991.

Lindauer worked as a Congressional staffer for Representative Peter DeFazio (D-OR, 1993) and then Representative Ron Wyden (D-OR, 1994) before joining the office of Senator Carol Moseley Braun (D-IL), where she worked as a press secretary and speech writer. She served as Press Secretary for Representative Zoe Lofgren (D-CA) from March 11, 2002 to May 14, 2002.

== Interest in the Middle East ==
In November 1993, a friend of Lindauer's father introduced her to former Vietnam War combat pilot Paul Hoven at a restaurant next to The Heritage Foundation. She began socializing in an informal circle of conservatives interested in counterterrorism, including Capitol Hill staff and intelligence community members, including Richard Fuisz and, according to an article posted on New Zealand website Scoop, senior Congressional staffer Kelly O'Meara.

Lindauer has described Fuisz as her Central Intelligence Agency (CIA) "contact" and "handler". At the time of Lindauer's first meeting with Fuisz, theories of the bombing of Pan Am Flight 103 in 1988 were divided between blaming the Libyan government under Moammar Gaddafi (which took responsibility in 2003) and the Syrian Ahmed Jabril. Lindauer said that Fuisz had shared with her his belief that the US government had falsely pinned the blame on Libya. Lindauer and Fuisz said they met an average of once per week from 1994 to 2001. In 2000, the Sunday Herald in Scotland reported that US sources told them Fuisz had been an operative for the CIA in Damascus during the 1980s. Fuisz did not confirm or deny this, saying he was not permitted to speak about it.

Lindauer said she began making visits to the Libyan mission at the United Nations (UN) in 1995 and with Iraqis at the UN in 1996. In 2000, she told Middle East Intelligence Bulletin that she had been subject to surveillance, threats, and was attacked after meeting Libyan officials in 1995 to discuss what she had learned about the Flight 103 bombing.

On November 26, 2000, then President-elect George W. Bush appointed Lindauer's second cousin once removed, Andrew Card, as White House Chief of Staff upon his inauguration. Card had previously served as Deputy Chief of Staff and Secretary of Transportation for George H. W. Bush, and had been selected by George W. Bush to run the 2000 Republican National Convention. Starting in 2000, Lindauer delivered multiple letters to Card, leaving them on the doorstep of his home in Northern Virginia. In her letters, she urged Card to intercede with President George W. Bush not to invade Iraq, and offered to act as a back channel in negotiations. According to Scoop, over approximately two years, Lindauer wrote Card a total of eleven letters, the last on January 6, 2003, two months before the invasion of Iraq. Card later told the FBI that Lindauer had tried to contact him several times, but according to a statement by White House spokesman Scott McClellan, Card did not recall seeing or talking to Lindauer after the January 2001 inauguration.

According to Scoop, in a 2008 hearing, one of Lindauer's associates testified that she had mentioned an imminent attack on Manhattan with airplanes in 2001. Lindauer, in her book, claims that she was asked by Fuisz to ask the Iraqi diplomats if they knew about an imminent attack. According to Lindauer, pre-9/11 information was part of her work with Fuisz.

According to Scoop, Fuisz's interactions with Lindauer ended in 2001, following a falling out after the September 11th attacks, no longer welcoming her to his office. He said that before the attacks, she was "Arabist, but Arabist from the standpoint of trying to lift sanctions, so that children would do better, and trying to get medicines into countries – principally I'm talking about Iraq and Libya." Lindauer described her falling out with Fuisz in a 2009 interview, saying that it had been in regard to the approach taken in reacting to the possibility of an imminent attack. He said that after September 11, "Susan, in her discussions, went from benign, in my opinion, to malignant... These discussions changed and now involved a very strong seditious bent."

== Arrest, incarceration and release ==
On March 11, 2004, Lindauer was arrested in Takoma Park, Maryland by the Federal Bureau of Investigation (FBI). She was taken to the FBI office in Baltimore. Outside of this office, she told WBAL-TV: "I'm an antiwar activist and I'm innocent. I did more to stop terrorism in this country than anybody else. I have done good things for this country. I worked to get weapons inspectors back to Iraq when everybody else said it was impossible."

Lindauer was indicted by a grand jury for "acting as an unregistered agent of a foreign government", an accusation usually made against foreign spies.

In an interview with Scoop, Lindauer stated she was charged (and held in detention) under the USA PATRIOT Act. She said that this was to silence her from revealing what she knew about 9/11, which was that the "airplane hijackings were used as a public cover for a controlled demolition of the Twin Towers and Building 7" and that the perpetrator Mohamed Atta was a highly trained CIA asset.

The indictment against Lindauer alleged that she accepted US$10,000 from the Iraqi Intelligence Service in 2002. Lindauer denied receiving the money, but confirmed taking a trip to Baghdad. Lindauer was also accused of meeting with an FBI agent posing as a Libyan, with whom she spoke about the "need for plans and foreign resources to support resistance groups operating in Iraq." Lindauer said she went to the meeting because of her interest in filing a war crimes suit against the U.S. and U.K. governments.

Pursuant to Lindauer's arrest, Congresswoman Lofgren released a statement saying she was "shocked" by the arrest, that she had no evidence of illicit activities by Lindauer, and that she would cooperate with the investigation. Robert Precht, an Assistant Dean of the University of Michigan Law School, said the charges were "weak" and that Lindauer was more likely a "misguided peacenik".

Lindauer was released on bond on March 13, 2004 to attend an arraignment the following week. Sanford Talkin of New York was appointed by the court as her lawyer.

Lindauer claimed she was conducting peace negotiations with representatives of several Muslim countries (including Iraq, Libya, Malaysia, and Yemen) in New York. According to transcripts Lindauer presented to the New York Times in 2004, these included meetings with Iraqi Muthanna al-Hanooti, a peace activist later accused of spying. Lindauer also said that the U.S. intelligence community was aware of these meetings and was monitoring her.

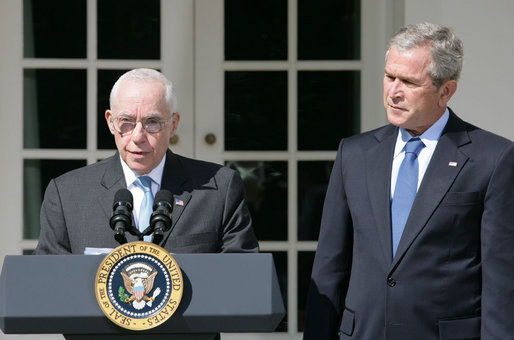
President George W. Bush listens to remarks by Mukasey after announcing his nomination to be Attorney General.

In 2005, Lindauer was incarcerated at Carswell Air Force Base in Fort Worth, Texas, for psychological evaluation. She was then moved to the Metropolitan Correctional Center in Manhattan. In 2006, she was released after judge Michael B. Mukasey ruled that Lindauer was unfit to stand trial. He noted that the severity of Lindauer's mental illness, which he described as a "lengthy delusional history", weakened the prosecution's case. In his decision he wrote, "Lindauer ... could not act successfully as an agent of the Iraqi government without in some way influencing normal people ... There is no indication that Lindauer ever came close to influencing anyone, or could have. The indictment charges only what it describes as an unsuccessful attempt to influence an unnamed government official, and the record shows that even lay people recognize that she is seriously disturbed."

During Lindauer's incarceration, she refused antipsychotic medication which the United States Department of Justice claimed would render her competent to stand trial. Judge Mukasey would not allow her to be forcibly medicated, as requested by the prosecution.

At a hearing in June 2008, Lindauer told reporters that she had been a CIA asset and said she had "been hung out to dry and scapegoated". In 2008, Justice Loretta A. Preska of the Federal District Court in New York City reaffirmed that Lindauer was mentally unfit to stand trial, despite Lindauer's insistence to the contrary. Testifying before Loretta Preska, The New York Times reported that Lindauer "angrily contested an accusation in her indictment that she had illegally lunched with Iraqi intelligence operatives."

On January 16, 2009, the government decided to not continue with the prosecution, saying, "prosecuting Lindauer would no longer be in the interests of justice."

== Book and subsequent claims ==
In 2010, Lindauer self-published a book about her experience titled Extreme Prejudice: The Terrifying Story of the Patriot Act and the Cover-Ups of 9/11 and Iraq. Lindauer wrote that, for a number of years, she had worked for the CIA and Defense Intelligence Agency, undertaking communications with the Iraqi government and serving as a back-channel in U.S. government negotiations.

In October 2012, she denied being the author of the Markovian Parallax Denigrate Usenet postings of August 5, 1996, which have been described as "the Internet's oldest and weirdest mystery"; a different Susan Lindauer had been a graduate student at the University of Wisconsin–Stevens Point at the time of the posts, and her email was the one spoofed in the message. In a Daily Dot piece about the story, Lindauer was described as "a purveyor of sundry conspiracy theories, from a Lockerbie bombing cover-up to 9/11 trutherism" and "a full-blown celebrity among certain members of the paranoid class".
