= Unfavorable Semicircle =

Defunct and mysterious 2015 YouTube channel

Overview
- Type: YouTube channel / Internet mystery
- Active dates: April 2015 – February 2016
- Status: Suspended / Defunct
- Notable traits: Massive volume of automated/obscure video uploads; Abstract audio-visual anomalies; Sagittarius symbol (♐) titles
- Genre / Medium: Outsider art / Digital art project
- Related phenomena: Webdriver Torso; Markovian Parallax Denigrate

Screenshot of ♐DELOCK, one of Unfavorable Semicircle's most famous videos

Unfavorable Semicircle is a defunct 2015 YouTube channel that garnered attention due to the high volume and unusual nature of the published videos, usually featuring distorted audio and graphics. The channel was suspended in February 2016 shortly after the BBC reported on the channel. Over the years, many theories have been formed about the nature of the project, including that the channel was a numbers station, an alternate reality game, a test channel looking for exploits, or outsider art. In June 2022, an anonymous Twitter user claiming to be the channel's creator said the channel was an outsider art project.

A Sagittarius symbol, present in unicode in most video titles

== Origins ==
In March 2015, a YouTube account with the title Unfavorable Semicircle was created; the channel began uploading large numbers of videos on April 5. The channel continued to post large numbers of videos all titled with the Sagittarius symbol or a random six digit number, or both, but most lacking a description. The videos often display abstract, pixelated images. In some cases, they show just a single dot in a field of solid brown. Some videos omit sound while some feature distorted sounds. Some videos are only seconds in length, while others are much longer; one completely silent video was 11 hours in length.

== Attention and disappearance ==
Due to the volume of uploads and the odd nature of the videos, observers started to take notice. Eventually, a small community on Reddit formed to investigate the channel. According to computer security specialist Alan Woodward at University of Surrey, it is probably "too complex" to be a numbers station, and is also unlikely to be a recruitment puzzle as those are usually announced in some way. The BBC has referred to Unfavorable Semicircle as "YouTube's strangest mystery". Unfavorable Semicircle has also been referred to as "one of the Top 10 Weirdest YouTube Channels". In February 2016, several hours after the BBC made an article on the channel, YouTube suspended the channel.

== Observations ==
For years, the ♐LOCK and ♐DELOCK videos were seen by some people as the keys to solving the channel's mystery, due to their name and eerie nature.

== Reason for creation ==
In a Twitter post, a user claiming to be the creator of Unfavorable Semicircle said that the goal was to "upload the most number of YouTube videos ever" and secondarily "to see if people would watch something truly and unknowable ... My hope was to fill some of the 'Internet Mystery' space left by Webdriver Torso".

== See also ==
- Markovian Parallax Denigrate
- Webdriver Torso
- Alternate reality game
