= Webdriver Torso =

YouTube channel made by Google to test video quality

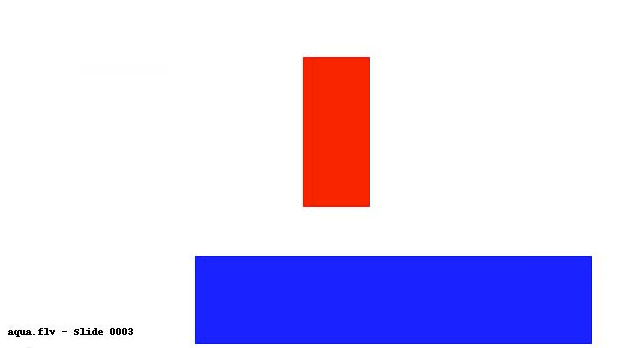
A typical Webdriver Torso slide. Quality loss is visible in the text and along the rectangle edges.

Webdriver Torso is a YouTube automated performance testing account that became famous in 2014 for speculations about its (then unexplained) nature and jokes featured in some of its videos.

The channel began uploading videos in September 2013, consisting of simple slides accompanied by beeps. It was brought to public attention in 2014 when it became a source of speculation for viewers who discovered it and noted three atypical videos featuring jokes. It remained a popular mystery until YouTube humorously acknowledged that the channel exists as an internal testing utility.

== Videos ==
"aqua", a typical Webdriver Torso video and also the first upload.

Most of the videos have the same format, with a pattern of blue and red rectangles and computer-generated tones. The channel has three videos that do not follow the channel's standards, featuring instead internal references or jokes. One of them, titled "tmpRkRL85" (presumably standing for "Temporary Rick Roll 1985" or "Template Rickroll 1985"), plays normally until the red rectangle becomes a silhouette of Rick Astley dancing (referencing the Rickrolling phenomenon) in the second half of the video.

External video on YouTube
- Eiffel Tower
- The "00014" video

The video "00014" is a piece of footage recorded in Paris that shows the Eiffel Tower being lit up at night. At the end of the video, the camera is put down, and the Webdriver Torso Facebook page is visible for a few frames. The last one, "0.455442373793", is only viewable in France, requires a payment of €1.99 to watch, and is only payable with a French credit card. It shows an episode of the American adult cartoon Aqua Teen Hunger Force dubbed in Spanish.

== Speculation ==
Before YouTube's confirmation of the channel as a test channel, there was some speculation about the identity and content of the videos. Hypotheses about the channel's purposes included a numbers station, contact by extraterrestrial life-forms, and a Cicada 3301 recruitment program.

=== Unexplained references ===
Despite Google having clarified the channel's purpose, this did not explain the seemingly humorous references contained in some of the videos. These include the Aqua Teen Hunger Force episode, the Rick Astley silhouette, and the Eiffel Tower footage. Additionally, Webdriver Torso at one time commented "Matei is highly intelligent". The "Matei" in question is unknown, but Basarab Matei, Matei Basarab, Matei Mancas, Matei Gruber, Matei Ciocarlie, and former Cinemassacre producer Mike Matei have all been suspected. The "Matei" comment was removed at some later time.

=== Soggetto Ventuno's investigation ===
An Italian blogger named Soggetto Ventuno found out that Webdriver Torso belongs to a network of accounts called "ytuploadtestpartner_torso". Ventuno then discovered some other accounts with similar videos, many of which were pulled or made private after Ventuno's investigations were published. The network linked to a Facebook page and a Twitter page, which have now both been taken down. The Facebook page had mentioned Johannes Leitner, a Google Zürich employee. Leitner was friends with another employee, Matei Gruber. A "Matei" is mentioned on 00014 (see above). Ventuno then compared scenes from pulled videos with Google Zürich photos, and noticed matching things, indicating that the pulled videos were recorded at Google Zürich, and that the channel and all similar channels were run from Google Zürich.

=== Purpose of videos ===
The videos are made to test YouTube video quality. After creation, the videos are uploaded to YouTube. The uploaded videos are then compared to the videos before they were uploaded, to see how much quality was lost.

=== YouTube's reply ===
When YouTube was asked about Webdriver Torso, they replied: "We're never gonna give you uploading that's slow or loses video quality, and we're never gonna let you down by playing YouTube in poor video quality. That's why we're always running tests like Webdriver Torso." This is a reference to Rick Astley's song "Never Gonna Give You Up".

== Easter eggs ==
Google Webdriver Torso logo

- When "Webdriver Torso" is searched on Google, the Google logo will look like a Webdriver Torso video. However, if a Google Doodle is running, it will sometimes not appear.
- In the Android L developer builds, the Android Version Easter Egg is a reference to Webdriver Torso videos.

== See also ==
- Test card
- Unfavorable Semicircle
