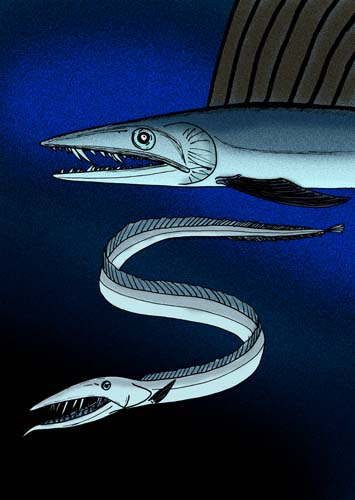
- Comparison of Longnosed lancetfish (top) and P. nagurai (bottom)

Scientific classification
- Kingdom: Animalia
- Phylum: Chordata
- Class: Actinopterygii
- Division: Teleostei
- Order: Aulopiformes
- Family: †Polymerichthyidae
- Genus: †Polymerichthys; Uyeno, 1967

Type species
- Polymerichthys nagurai Uyeno, 1967

= Polymerichthys =

Polymerichthys Temporal range: Late Oligocene to Late Miocene

Extinct genus of ray-finned fishes

Polymerichthys is an extinct genus of superficially eel-like aulopiform fish known from the late Oligocene to the middle-late Miocene. It contains a single described species, P. nagurai from the Middle Miocene of Japan, though several indeterminate specimens are also known from Russia and Italy.

== Etymology ==
The generic name literally translates as "many meristic fish," in reference to how the fish has numerous meristics units, including how the dorsal fin, which runs down the length of the body starting from behind the head, has somewhere between 300 and 350 rays, and how it has at least 186 vertebrae. The specific name honors the holotype's discoverer, Yuzo Nagura.

== Taxonomy ==
The holotype specimen of P. nagurai, no. 6599, was originally collected by Masayasu Nagura, a suzuri maker, around 1927 from the middle Miocene-aged Tubozawa Formation of Aichi Prefecture. In addition, several partial fossil specimens of indeterminate Polymerichthys species are known from the Late Oligocene (Holmsk Formation) to middle-late Miocene (Kurasi Formation) of Sakhalin Island, Russia. A jaw of Polymerichthys has also been reported from the middle Miocene of Italy, which appears to be from a taxon highly distinct from the Pacific polymerichthyids based on the number of teeth and the tooth surface texture.

The type specimen demonstrates several features typical of other families of Alepisauroidei, including head anatomy very similar to the daggertooths of Anotopteridae, and a well-developed dorsal fin similar to that of the lancetfish of Alepisauridae. Their closest relative were likely the lancetfish.

== Ecology ==
The polymerichthyids were likely highly specialized deepwater predators that inhabited the northern Pacific Ocean and likely the Tethys Ocean from the late Paleogene to the Neogene.

== See also ==
Other notable extinct Cenozoic aulopiforms include:

- Argillichthys, a synodontid lizardfish from the Ypresian London Clay
- Alepisaurus paronai, an extinct lancetfish that lived in middle Miocene Piemonte
