= Blåhaj =

Toy shark produced by IKEA

- Small and large variants of Blåhaj, displayed from the bottom (above) and side (below)
- Other names: IKEA Shark
- Type: Stuffed toy
- Invented by: IKEA of Sweden
- Company: IKEA
- Availability: 2014–present
- Materials: Polyester
- Features: Embroidered eyes
- Official website

Blåhaj (Swedish pronunciation: [ˈblôːhaj]; lit. 'blue shark'; colloquially anglicized as /ˈblɑːhɑːʒ/, /ˈblɑːhɑː/, or /ˈbloʊhaɪ/; sometimes called IKEA shark) is a plush toy manufactured and sold by the Swedish company IKEA. The toy, modeled after a blue shark and made of recycled polyester, has maintained its status as a globally popular internet meme since the late 2010s. It also became a cultural icon in countries like Russia and China, played a symbolic role in Switzerland's same-sex marriage referendum, and gained significance within the transgender community. It has also been used as a mascot by IKEA in some regions.

== Product description ==
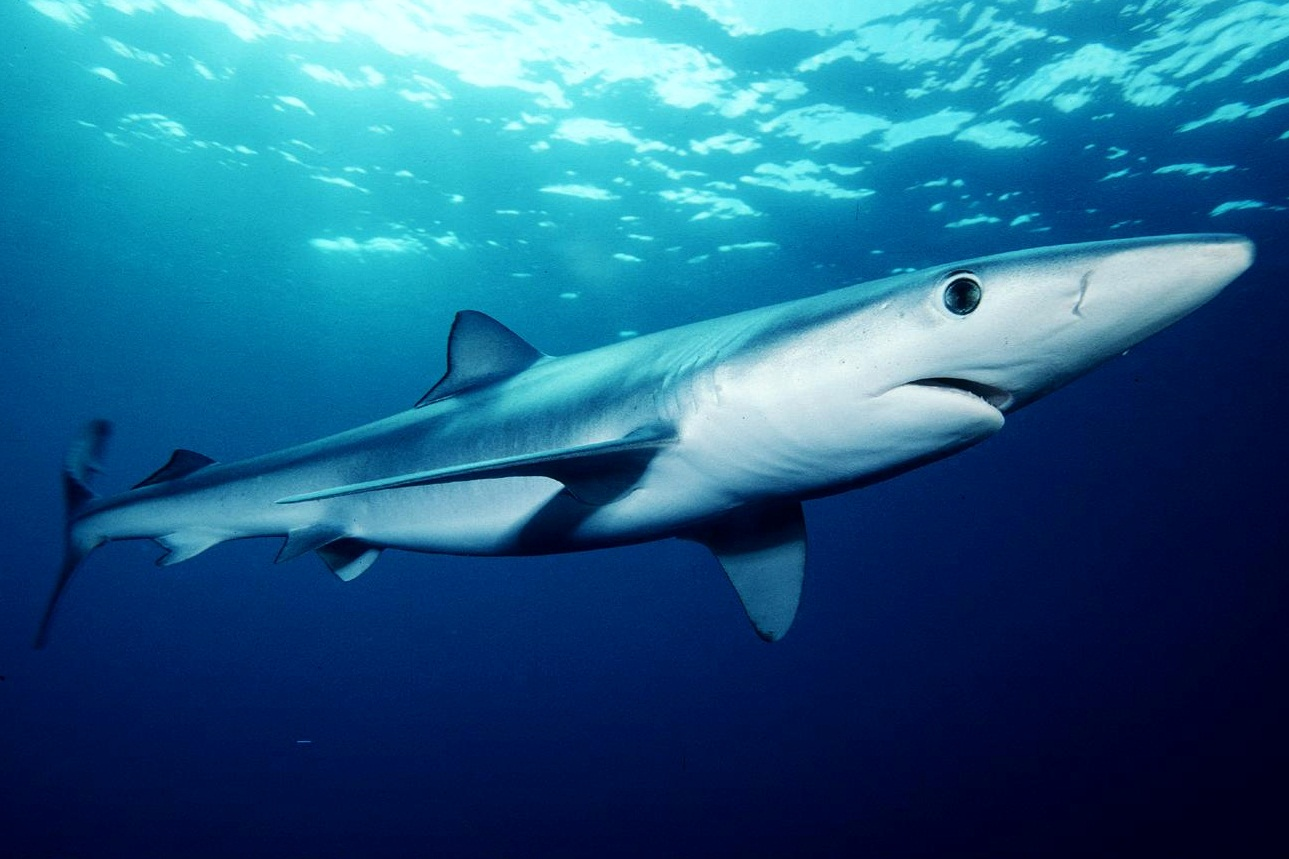
A blue shark, the model and namesake of Blåhaj

A Blåhaj is a stuffed toy resembling a blue shark. Both the outer fabric and the hollow fiber filling are made out of polyester. The filling is 100% recycled. It is available in two sizes – a large 1-meter (39 1/4 in) version and a small 0.55-meter (21 3/4 in) version. It can be machine-washed at 40°C (104°F). Its name is the Swedish word blåhaj, meaning 'blue shark'.

IKEA plush toys, including Blåhaj, are designed with embroidered eyes rather than the commonly used plastic ones. This design is primarily a safety measure to eliminate the choking hazard that detached plastic eyes pose to young children. Additionally, IKEA states on its website that this method enhances the toy's durability, ensuring it can better withstand play and washing over a long period.

== Production and distribution ==
IKEA first sold its shark plush design from at least 2008 under the names "Grössby" (Swedish pronunciation: [ˈɡrœsːbyː]) and "Klappar Haj" (Swedish pronunciation: [ˈklapːar haj]; lit. 'petting shark'). Unlike the current blue Blåhaj, these original versions were grey. The Grössby variant featured a slightly stiffer filling, comparable to IKEA's "Ensta" (Swedish pronunciation: [ˈeːnsta]) killer whale plush.

By 2012, IKEA transitioned to using blue fabric for the plush but continued to use the "Klappar Haj" name. The product was rebranded with the current "Blåhaj" name in early 2014.

An earlier predecessor, named "Korall Haj" (Swedish pronunciation: [kʊˈralː haj]; lit. 'coral shark'), dates back to 2006.

Blåhaj are manufactured in Indonesia and Ludhiana, India.

=== Marketing ===
In response to the toy's popularity, IKEA produced a line of Blåhaj shopping bags, which are sold at its stores in some regions, including Taiwan and Malaysia. IKEA also used Blåhaj in marketing material; in 2021, IKEA Japan collaborated with Wieden+Kennedy Tokyo to use the toy in a marketing campaign for tiny apartments sold by IKEA in the region. In the campaign, a Blåhaj is depicted as a real estate agent who envisions a tiny apartment. IKEA of Malaysia and Taiwan sold red-bean and sesame-filled buns resembling Blåhajar. On November 9, 2022, IKEA Hong Kong opened its Tsim Sha Tsui branch, which featured Blåhajar as part of its advertising campaign, punning the location as "Tsim Shark Tsui".

== As a cultural phenomenon ==
In 2014, Sharkhugger, a Tumblr user, posted a photo of six Blåhajar gathered around a table in an antropormorphic fashion. Sharkhugger is believed to have posted the first viral image of a Blåhaj doing human activities, and more photographs of Blåhajar circulated on Tumblr and Instagram. By 2018, Blåhaj gained wider prominence as an internet meme, with social media users worldwide, such as in Russia, posting lighthearted images of it. Many images also featured the toy in human-like scenes, such as reading a book or dining with other Blåhajar.

The toy continued to inspire memes and social media posts on Instagram, Twitter, and TikTok, and is a popular product in numerous territories. A subreddit with over 103,000 members dedicated to Blåhaj was made, where people post memes and images of their Blåhaj "doing silly things". Blåhaj made a brief appearance in the Marvel Studios-produced television series Hawkeye.

In September 2021, concerns arose after Twitter accounts representing IKEA in Ireland and Singapore suggested, in response to customer inquiries, that Blåhaj would be discontinued in April 2022. These worries intensified as the toy was reported to be out of stock or delisted from IKEA stores in China, Taiwan, and Singapore. The news prompted a significant social media reaction, with "Blåhaj" trending for several days as fans expressed fears of the toy becoming "extinct". A subreddit named r/savetheBlåhaj was made, and a petition on Change.org was started to keep Blåhaj in production, which over 7,000 people signed. Subsequently, IKEA's USA Twitter account affirmed the toy's continued availability in the United States, and IKEA's Media Relations team later clarified that Blåhaj was not being discontinued globally. They explained that the delistings and stock issues in some countries were due to temporary supply chain disruptions due to the COVID-19 pandemic. Following this, fans reacted with mock outrage when IKEA stores in Hong Kong showcased Blåhaj in a demonstration of vacuum packing bags, jokingly acting as if flattening them was an act of cruelty.

=== As an LGBTQ symbol ===
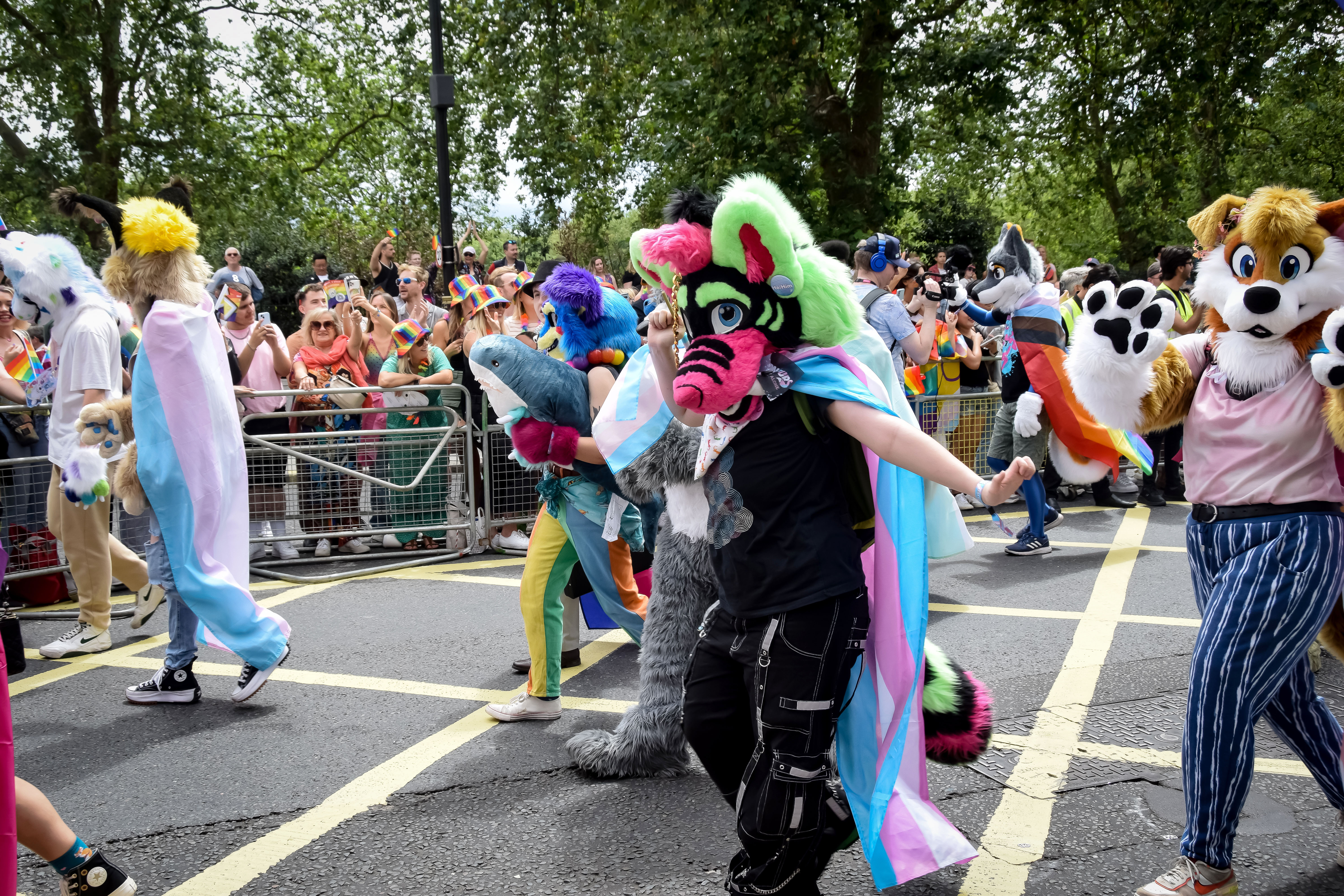
Blåhaj held during London Pride 2023

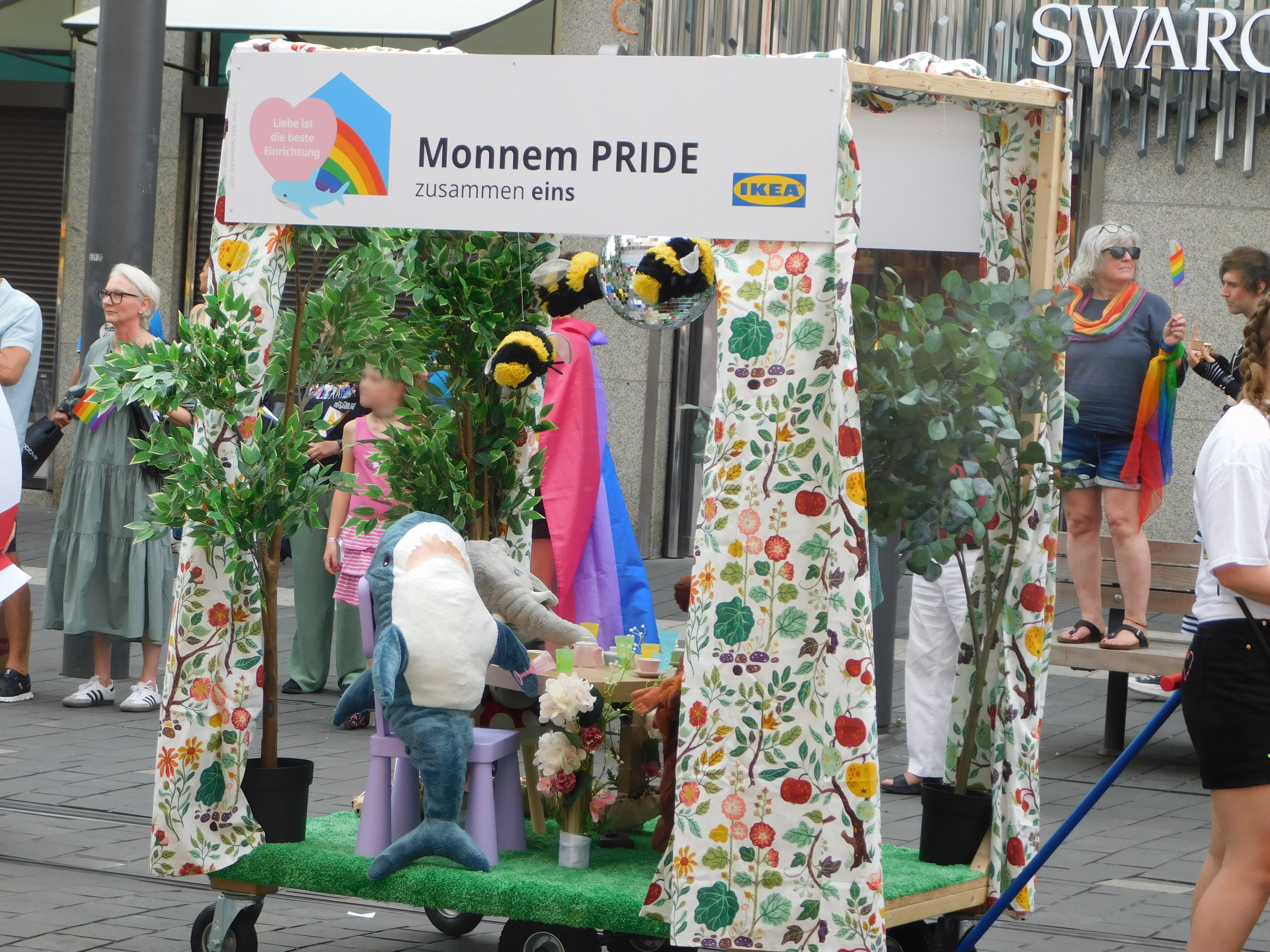
Blåhaj in an IKEA float during the 2025 pride in Mannheim, Germany

Since 2020, Blåhaj has been associated with the LGBTQ and particularly transgender communities on the Internet, in part because the primary colors of the toy (blue body, pink mouth, and white belly) match the colors of the transgender flag. It may have been adopted, primarily among young people, with Reddit posts as early as 2019. IKEA Switzerland acknowledged this phenomenon when the company ran a series of ads supporting the 2021 Swiss same-sex marriage referendum. One such ad featured a Blåhaj in bed with IKEA's polar bear toy, Snuttig (Swedish pronunciation: [ˈsnɵtːɪg]). Some transgender people buy Blåhaj or are gifted one as a rite of passage after coming out.

== See also ==
- Djungelskog
- Lufsig
