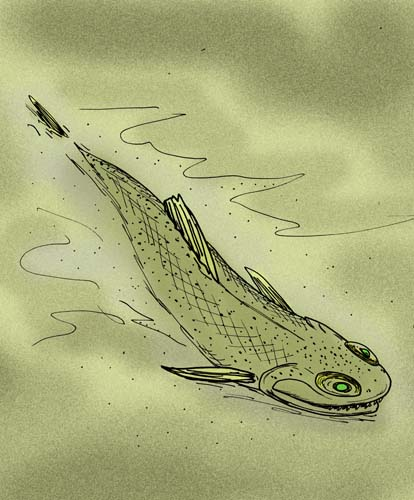
- Artist's reconstruction

Scientific classification
- Kingdom: Animalia
- Phylum: Chordata
- Class: Actinopterygii
- Division: Teleostei
- Order: Aulopiformes
- Family: Synodontidae
- Genus: †Argillichthys; Casier, 1966
- Species: †A. toombsi

Binomial name
- †Argillichthys toombsi Casier, 1966

= Argillichthys =

Argillichthys Temporal range: Ypresian, 54–50 Ma

Extinct genus of ray-finned fishes

Argillichthys is an extinct marine lizardfish known from the Lower Eocene. It contains a single species, A. toombsi, from the Ypresian-aged London Clay Formation in England. It is known from a skull. It is thought to be a stem-member of Synodontidae.

== See also ==
Other notable extinct Cenozoic aulopiforms include:

- Alepisaurus paronai, an extinct lancetfish that lived in middle Miocene Piemonte
- Polymerichthys, another extinct alepisauroid from Middle Miocene Japan
