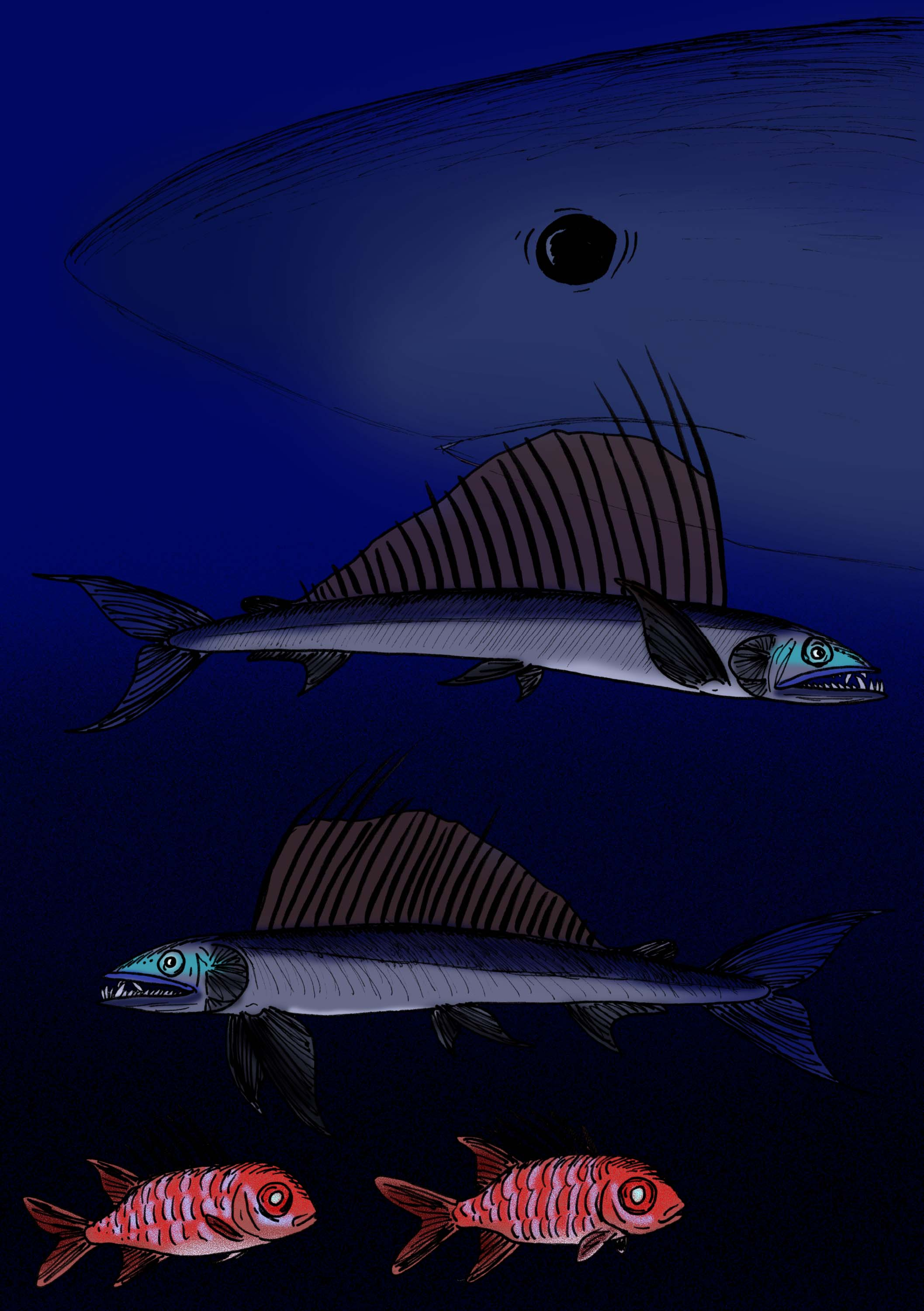
- Artist's reconstruction

Scientific classification
- Domain: Eukaryota
- Kingdom: Animalia
- Phylum: Chordata
- Class: Actinopterygii
- Order: Aulopiformes
- Family: Alepisauridae
- Genus: Alepisaurus
- Species: †A. paronai

Binomial name
- †Alepisaurus paronai d'Erasmo, 1923

= Alepisaurus paronai =

Alepisaurus paronai Temporal range: Middle Miocene

Extinct species of lancetfish

Alepisaurus paronai is an extinct species of lancetfish known from a fossil skull found in Middle Miocene-aged strata in Piedmont, Italy. The skull is very similar in anatomy and dimensions to that of the extant long-snouted lancetfish. The specific name honors one Professor Carlo Fabrizio Parona, a friend and personal mentor of its describer, Geremia d'Erasmo.

== See also ==
Other notable extinct Cenozoic aulopiforms include:

- Argillichthys, a synodontid lizardfish from the Ypresian London Clay
- Polymerichthys, a closely related alepisauroid from Middle Miocene Japan
