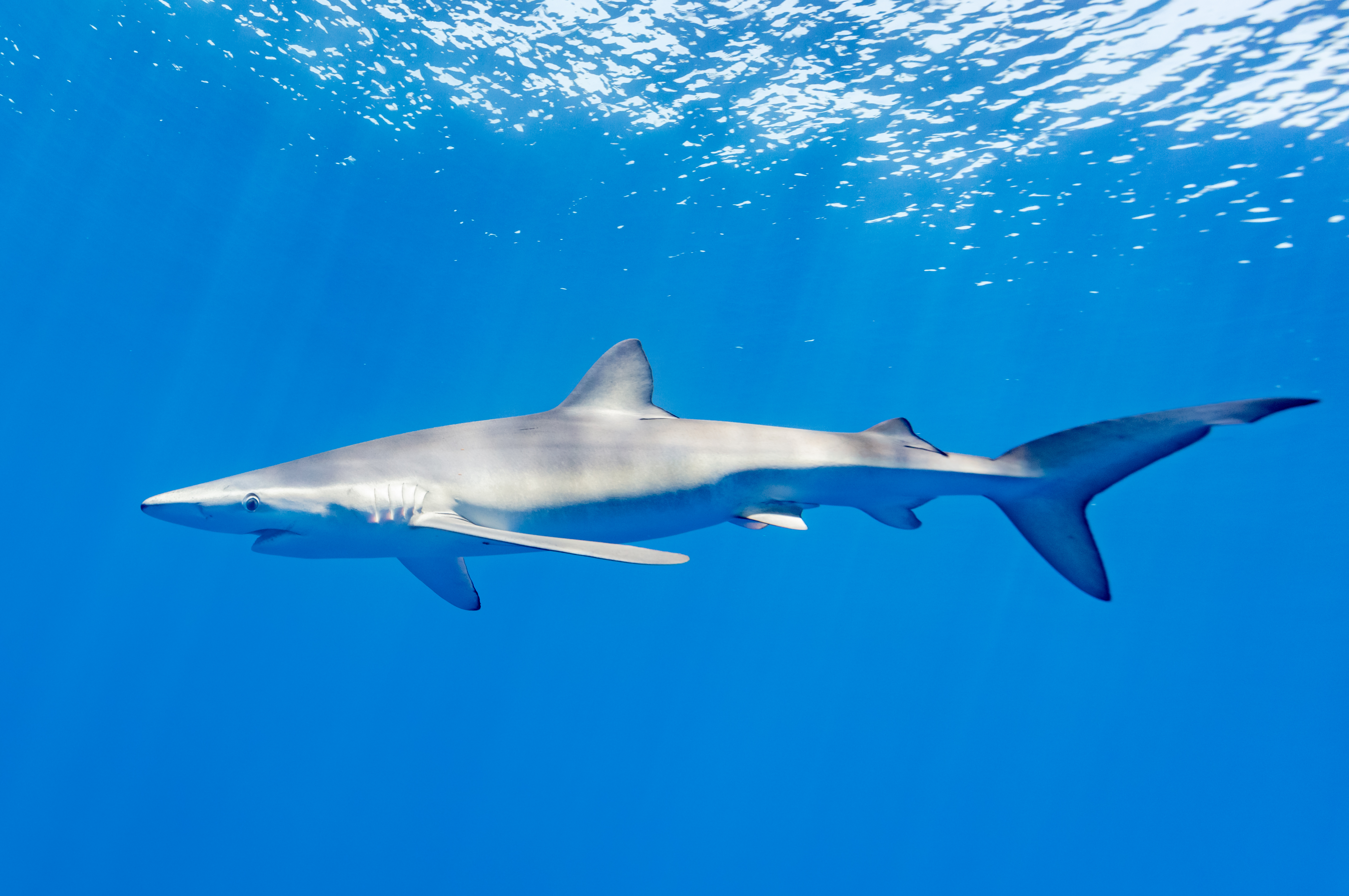
- A blue shark in the Azores

Conservation status
- Near Threatened (IUCN 3.1)
- CITES Appendix II

Scientific classification
- Kingdom: Animalia
- Phylum: Chordata
- Class: Chondrichthyes
- Subclass: Elasmobranchii
- Division: Selachii
- Order: Carcharhiniformes
- Family: Carcharhinidae
- Genus: Prionace; Cantor, 1849
- Species: P. glauca

Binomial name
- Prionace glauca (Linnaeus, 1758)
- Range of the blue shark

Synonyms
- List: Carcharhinus macki (Phillipps, 1935); Carcharias aethiops Philippi, 1902; Carcharias glaucus (Linnaeus, 1758); Carcharias gracilis Philippi, 1887; Carcharias hirundinaceus Valenciennes, 1839; Carcharias pugae Pérez Canto, 1886; Carcharias rondeletii (Risso, 1810); Carcharinus glaucus (Linnaeus, 1758); Galeus thalassinus Valenciennes, 1835; Glyphis glaucus (Linnaeus, 1758); Hypoprion isodus Philippi, 1887; Isurus glaucus (Linnaeus, 1758); Prionace mackiei Phillipps, 1935; Prionacea glauca (Linnaeus, 1758); Squalus adscensionis Osbeck, 1765; Squalus caeruleus Blainville, 1816; Squalus glaucus Linnaeus, 1758; Squalus rondeletii Risso, 1810; Thalassinus rondeletii (Risso, 1810); Thalassinus rondeletti (Risso, 1810); Thalassinus rondelettii (Risso, 1810); Thalassorhinus vulpecula Valenciennes, 1839

= Blue shark =

Blue shark Temporal range: Miocene-recent

Species of shark

The blue shark (Prionace glauca), also known as the great blue shark, is a species of requiem shark in the family Carcharhinidae which inhabits deep waters in the world's temperate and tropical oceans. It is the only living species of genus Prionace. An extinct species, P. clarki, is known from teeth from California of the Late Pliocene. Averaging around 3.1 m (10 ft) and preferring cooler waters, the blue shark migrates long distances, such as from New England to South America. It is listed as Near Threatened by the IUCN.

Although generally lethargic, they can move very quickly. Blue sharks are viviparous and are noted for large litters of 25 to over 100 pups. They feed primarily on small forage fish and squid, although they can take larger prey. Some of the blue shark's predators include the killer whale and larger sharks like the tiger shark and the great white shark. Their maximum lifespan is still unknown, but it is believed that they can live up to 20 years. They are one of the most abundant pelagic sharks, with large numbers being caught by fisheries as bycatch on longlines and nets.

The earliest fossil teeth of this species are known from the Miocene of Sri Lanka. Other fossil teeth of this species are known from the Miocene and Pliocene of Chile, Italy, and possibly Belgium.

== Taxonomy ==
A 2023 study suggested that the species should be reclassified into the genus Carcharhinus.

== Distribution and habitat ==
The blue shark is an oceanic and epipelagic shark found worldwide in deep temperate and tropical waters from the surface to about 350 m (1,150 ft). In temperate seas it may approach shore, where it can be observed by divers; while in tropical waters, it inhabits greater depths. It lives as far north as Norway and as far south as Chile. Blue sharks are found off the coasts of every continent, except Antarctica. Its greatest Pacific concentrations occur between 20° and 50° North, but with strong seasonal fluctuations. In the tropics, it spreads evenly between 20° N and 20° S. It prefers water temperatures between 12 and 20 °C (54–68 °F), but can be seen in water ranging from 3.9 to 31 °C (39.0–87.8 °F). Records from the Atlantic show a regular clockwise migration within the prevailing currents.

== Description ==
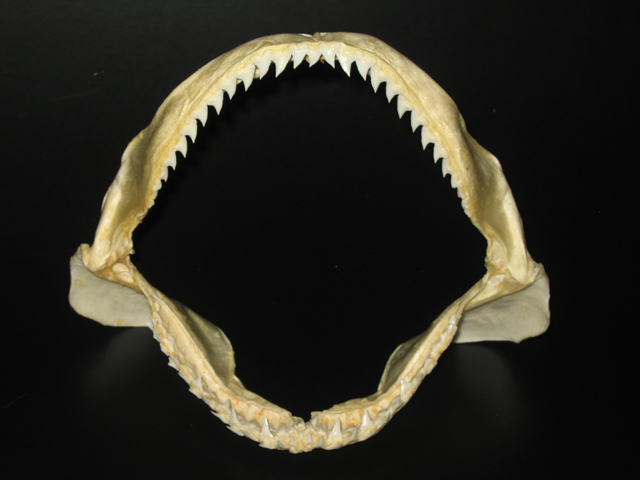
Jaws

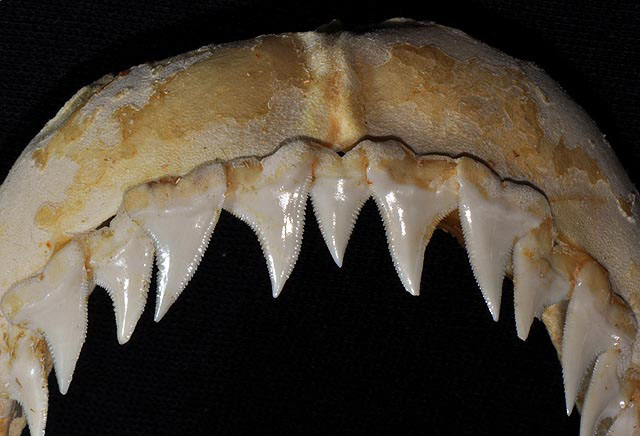
Upper teeth

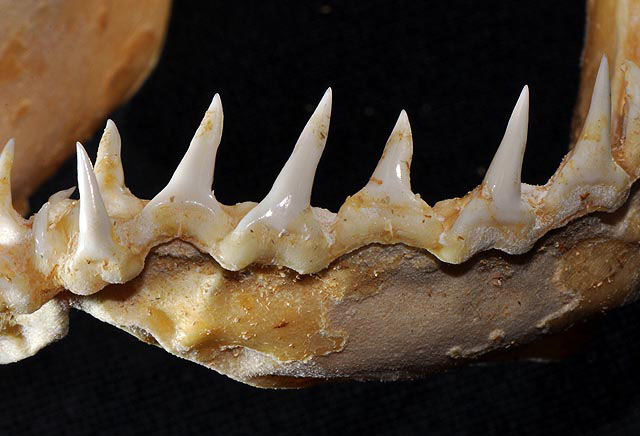
Lower teeth

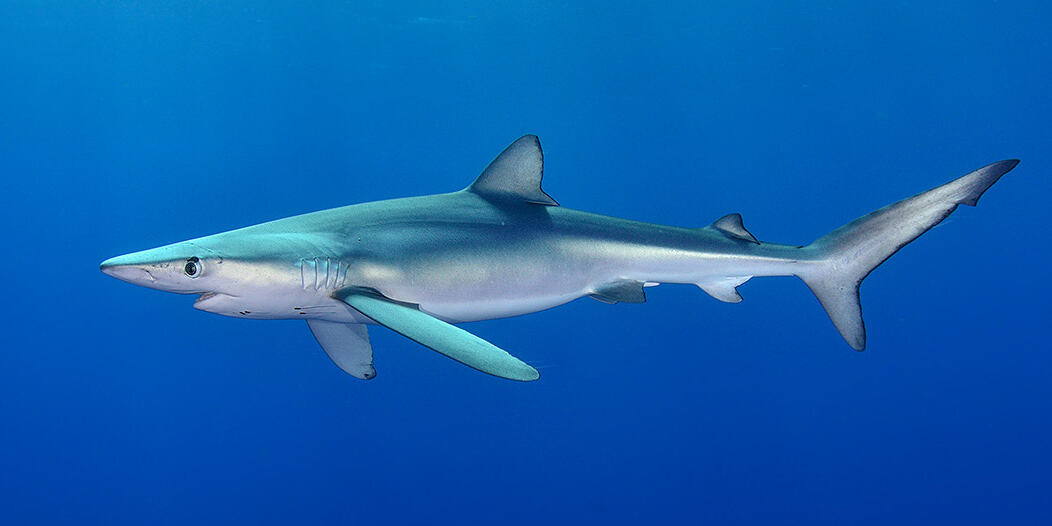
In the Azores

Blue sharks are light-bodied with long pectoral fins. Like many other sharks, blue sharks are countershaded: the top of the body is deep blue, lighter on the sides, and the underside is white. The male blue shark commonly grows to 1.82 to 2.82 m (6.0 to 9.3 ft) at maturity, whereas the larger females commonly grow to 2.2 to 3.3 m (7.2 to 10.8 ft) at maturity. Large specimens can grow to 3.8 m (12 ft) long. Occasionally, an outsized blue shark is reported, with one widely printed claim of a length of 6.1 m (20 ft), but no shark even approaching this size has been scientifically documented. The blue shark is fairly elongated and slender in build and typically weighs from 27 to 55 kg (60 to 121 lb) in males and from 93 to 182 kg (205 to 401 lb) in large females. Occasionally, a female in excess of 3 metres (10 ft) will weigh over 204 kg (450 lb). The heaviest reported weight for the species was 391 kg (862 lb). However, anecdotal claims exist for the species to exceptionally reach 800–900 kg (1,800–2,000 lb) in weight, though these are not verified. The blue shark is also ectothermic.

== Sensory ==
The five senses that blue sharks share with other members of the Carcharhinidae family are vision, hearing, lateral line, chemoreception, and electroreception. These senses allow them to perceive and react to a variety of biotic or abiotic stimuli in their immediate environment and across a different range of spatial scales.

The well-developed eyes of blue sharks exhibit interspecific variations in their eye structure, which are characteristic of adaptations for vision in a variety of light environments, from the brightly lit surface waters to the darkness of the deep sea. The lateral position of the eyes in the head allows a cyclopean visual field of 360° in the vertical plane and between 308° and 338° in the horizontal plane.

The morphology of the inner ears of blue sharks is similar to that of other gnathostomes. It consists of a membranous labyrinth that is made up of three semicircular canals that are filled with fluid and arranged orthogonally, as well as three otolithic organs, which are the sacculus, utriculus, and lagena. These sharks are most sensitive to frequencies below roughly 100 Hz, but they can hear sounds up to roughly 1000 Hz.

The blue shark's lateral line is a mechanosensory structure that can detect particle motion. As such, it can react to mechanical disturbances caused by hydrodynamic stimuli that are not auditory. It is used to determine the direction and speed of water currents as well as the vibrations produced by prey, predators, and similar species moving through the water.

Blue sharks' chemosensory system is made up of gustation, and olfaction, which is a common chemical sense. Functions like intraspecific social interactions, communication, reproduction, and food detection are all linked to smell. Gustation is mainly related to feeding and involves using taste buds to process food and assess its palatability through direct contact, which usually results in a decision to swallow or reject it.

Blue sharks can detect weak electrical potentials generated by inanimate objects and other animals through specialized receptors. These sharks use their electrical sense to locate and capture prey, as well as to avoid predators. As they move through the Earth's magnetic field, they may also sense the weak electrical fields produced by nearby water currents or their own bodies, which can aid in navigation and orientation.

The ampullae of Lorenzini are electroreceptors of the ampullary type and develop from the lateral line placodes. Each ampulla consists of a pore on the surface of the skin, connected to a narrow dermal chamber called an ampullary bulb by a small canal with a diameter of about one millimetre. These sharks are most responsive to fluctuating electrical fields between 0.1 and 10 Hz, with peak sensitivity around 1 Hz.

Although the receptors primarily detect low-frequency alternating currents, they are particularly attracted to steady direct current electric fields. However, for the shark to detect a continuous DC voltage, it must move relative to the voltage source.

In the northeastern coast of the United States, it was discovered that blue sharks are able to maintain a straight course for hundreds of kilometres over many days. It appears that the only continuously available cue that could be used to accomplish this is the geomagnetic field.

== Reproduction ==
=== Sexual maturity ===
Maturity is assessed by observing sexual products and the developmental stage of reproductive organs. Five reproductive variables are examined for their relationship to body growth: presence or absence of semen in the ductus deferens ampullae, length and wet weight of the testicle, Size and rigidity of the claspers. To assess maturity, the clasper's inner length and degree of calcification are recorded: Mature males have fully calcified claspers that extend beyond the inner margin of their pelvic fins. Immature males have claspers that are either shorter or longer than the inner border but not fully calcified.

=== Mating behaviour ===
Male blue sharks primarily court non-pregnant mature females since mating marks on females are common, appearing as several tiny incisions arranged in a semicircle on their Dorsal fins. These marks are the result of non-feeding bites during courtship and mating. Female blue sharks have evolved skin three times thicker than that of males to withstand the rigors of mating. Female blue sharks are classified as immature, subadult, or mature based on the size and development of their ovary, oviducal gland, and uterus. Mature females have enlarged uterine walls, a fully differentiated oviducal gland, visible and enlarged Ovarian follicles and a right ovary separated and developed from the epigonal organ. Immature females have an undifferentiated oviducal gland and uterus, a small right ovary lodged within the epigonal organ, and no visible follicles.

=== Reproductive strategy and lifecycle ===
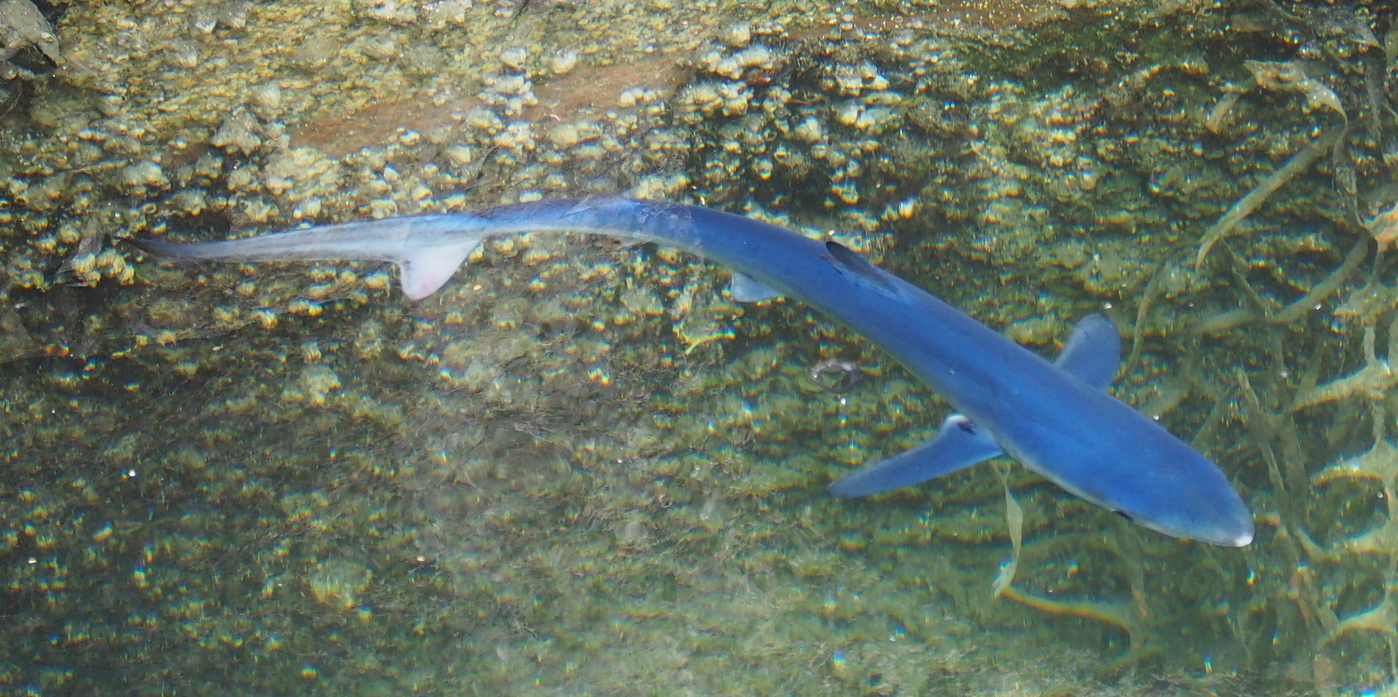
Juvenile in Galicia, Spain

Blue sharks are viviparous, with a yolk-sac placenta, giving birth to 4 to 135 pups per litter after a gestation period of 9 to 12 months. After birth, young sharks are left in specific nursery areas outside adult regions to develop independently. These nurseries offer a safe environment for newborns during their early months. Females mature at five to six years of age, while males mature at four to five years. Research suggests that females may exhibit natal and reproductive philopatry, meaning they return to specific sites to give birth.

== Ecology ==
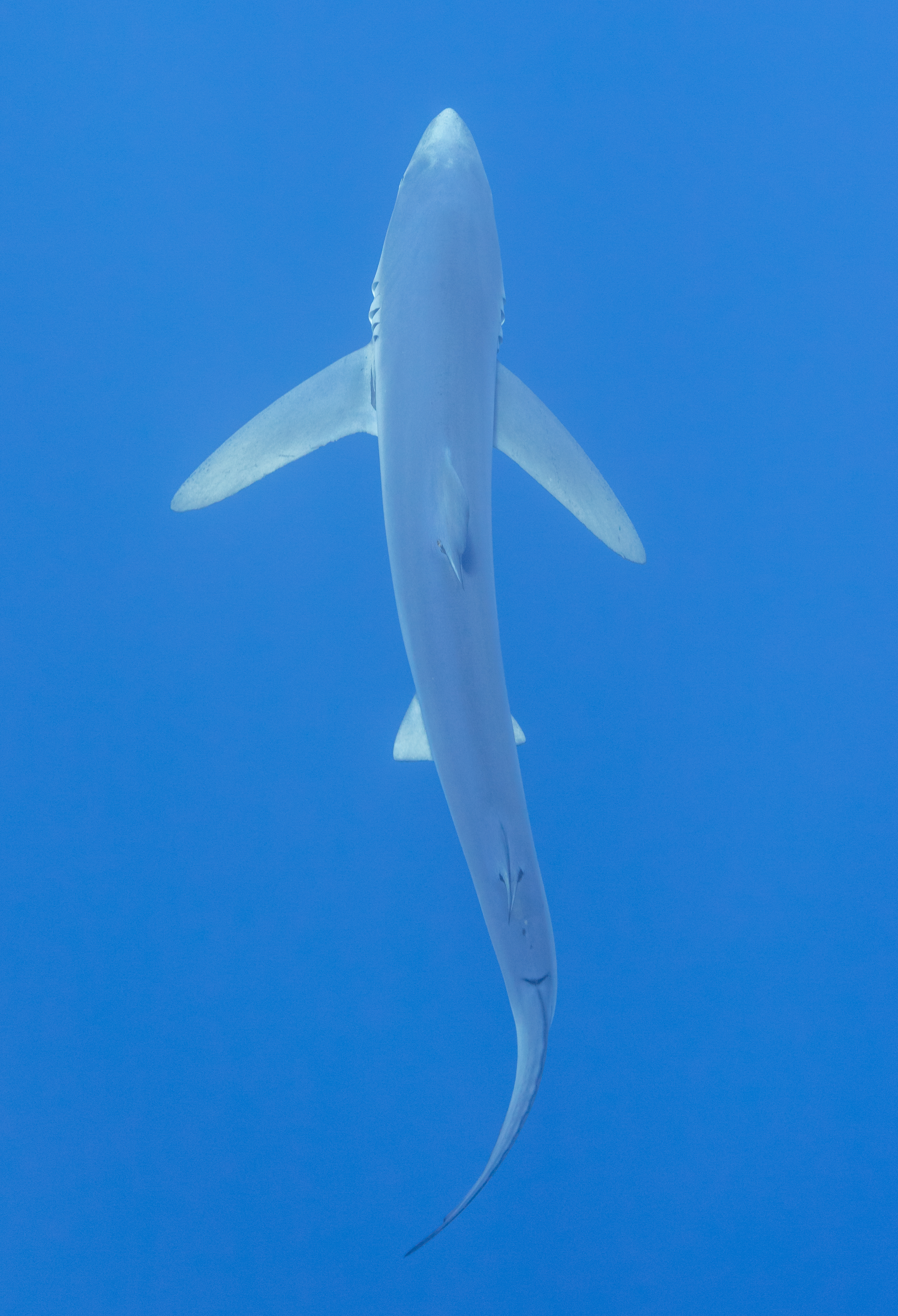
Dorsal view

=== Migration ===
Blue sharks are a highly migratory species, travelling vast distances across temperate and tropical waters. Their migrations are influenced by seasonal changes, prey availability, and the need for optimal environmental conditions. These sharks move both horizontally and vertically. Their swimming behaviour varies depending on the time of day. During the day, blue sharks move at a mean rate of 1.2 kilometers per hour, with a mean swimming speed of 1.3 kilometers per hour. At night, their activity increases, with a mean movement rate of 1.8 kilometers per hour and a swimming speed of 2.8 kilometers per hour. These increases in speed often occur during brief dives, particularly at night when sharks exhibit more vertical movement, ranging from shallow waters to depths exceeding 100 meters.

Blue sharks are most active at night, particularly in the early evening, with their lowest activity occurring during the early morning hours. During the day, they tend to remain around a depth of 30 meters, while at night they venture slightly deeper, around 40 meters. Most of their time is spent within a depth range of 18 to 42 meters, although they sometimes dive deeper. Their behaviour is also influenced by water temperature, preferring a narrow range of 14 to 16°C, though they are found in waters between 8.5 and 17.5°C. Blue sharks often swim near the surface in cooler months, but this behaviour decreases during the coldest or warmest months, likely due to surface temperature changes.

=== Feeding ===
Squid are the most important prey for blue sharks, but their diet includes other invertebrates, such as cuttlefish, blanket octopuses, and pelagic octopuses, as well as lobster, shrimp, crab, a large number of bony fishes (such as long-snouted lancetfish, snake mackerel and oilfish), small sharks, mammalian carrion and occasional sea birds (such as great shearwaters). Whale and porpoise blubber and meat have been retrieved from the stomachs of captured specimens and they are known to take cod from trawl nets. Sharks have been observed and documented working together as a "pack" to herd prey into a concentrated group from which they can easily feed. Blue sharks may eat tuna, which have been observed taking advantage of the herding behaviour to opportunistically feed on escaping prey. The observed herding behaviour was undisturbed by different species of shark in the vicinity that normally would pursue the common prey. The blue shark can swim at fast speeds, allowing it to catch up with prey easily. Its triangular teeth allow it to easily catch hold of slippery prey.

=== Predators ===
Younger and smaller individuals may be eaten by larger sharks, such as great white sharks and tiger sharks. Orcas have been reported to hunt blue sharks. This shark may host several species of parasites. For example, the blue shark is a definitive host of the tetraphyllidean tapeworm, Pelichnibothrium speciosum (Prionacestus bipartitus). It becomes infected by eating intermediate hosts, probably opah (Lampris guttatus) and/or longnose lancetfish (Alepisaurus ferox).

California sea lions (Zalophus californianus), Northern elephant seals (Mirounga angustirostris) and Cape fur seals (Arctocephalus pusillus pusillus) have been observed to feed on blue sharks.

Despite having excellent binocular vision and the capacity to see ahead when pursuing prey, research indicates that blue sharks are not always adept at spotting predators approaching from behind. According to an experiment, a large predator's best attack angle when pursuing a blue shark is probably from the caudal direction. This puts the predator in a position to strike the caudal fin of the shark and immobilize it. Blue sharks are not totally helpless against a tail-on approach, though, as they can adjust their escape performance based on the reaction distance.

Rather than reacting at a greater distance and trying to swim away at a high sustained speed, blue sharks likely concentrate their energy on outmaneuvering predators with sharp turns and brief bursts of acceleration.

== Relationship to humans ==
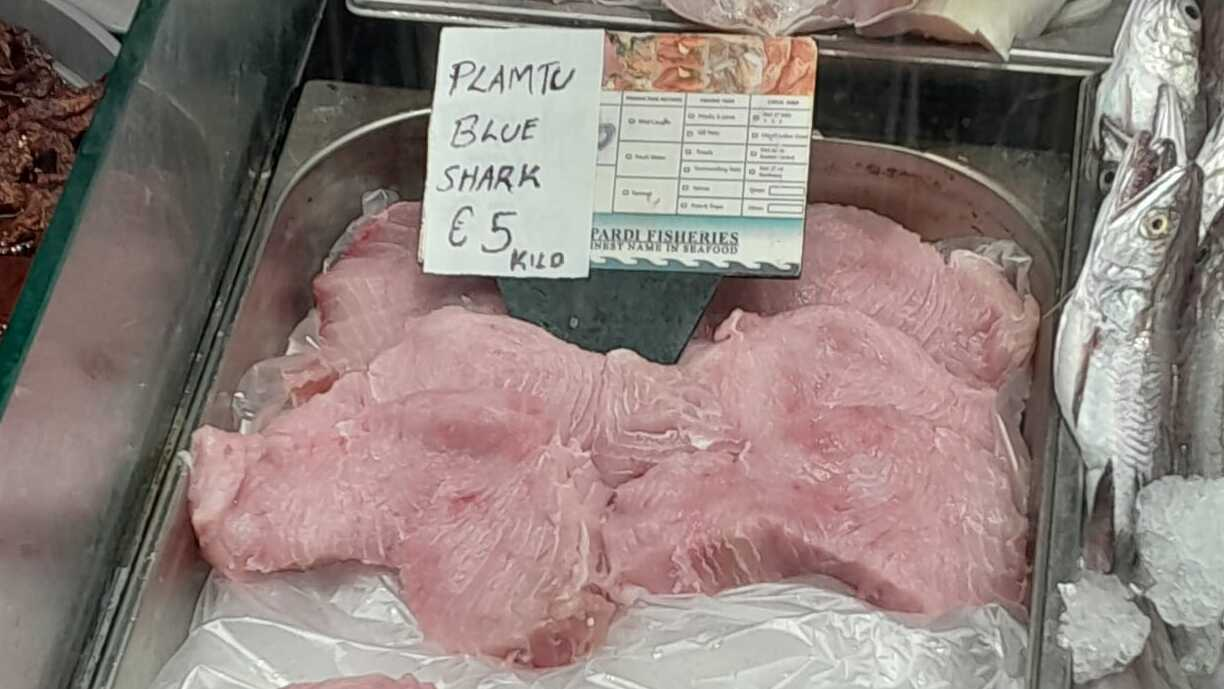
Blue shark meat on sale in Malta

Global capture production of Blue shark (Prionace glauca) in thousand tonnes from 1950 to 2022, as reported by the FAO

Blue shark meat is edible, but not widely sought after; it is consumed fresh, dried, smoked and salted and diverted for fishmeal. There is a report of high concentration of heavy metals (mercury and lead) in the edible flesh. The skin is used for leather, the fins for shark-fin soup and the liver for oil. Blue sharks are occasionally sought as game fish for their beauty and speed.

Blue sharks rarely bite humans. From 1580 up until 2013, the blue shark was implicated in only 13 biting incidents, four of which ended fatally.

=== In captivity ===
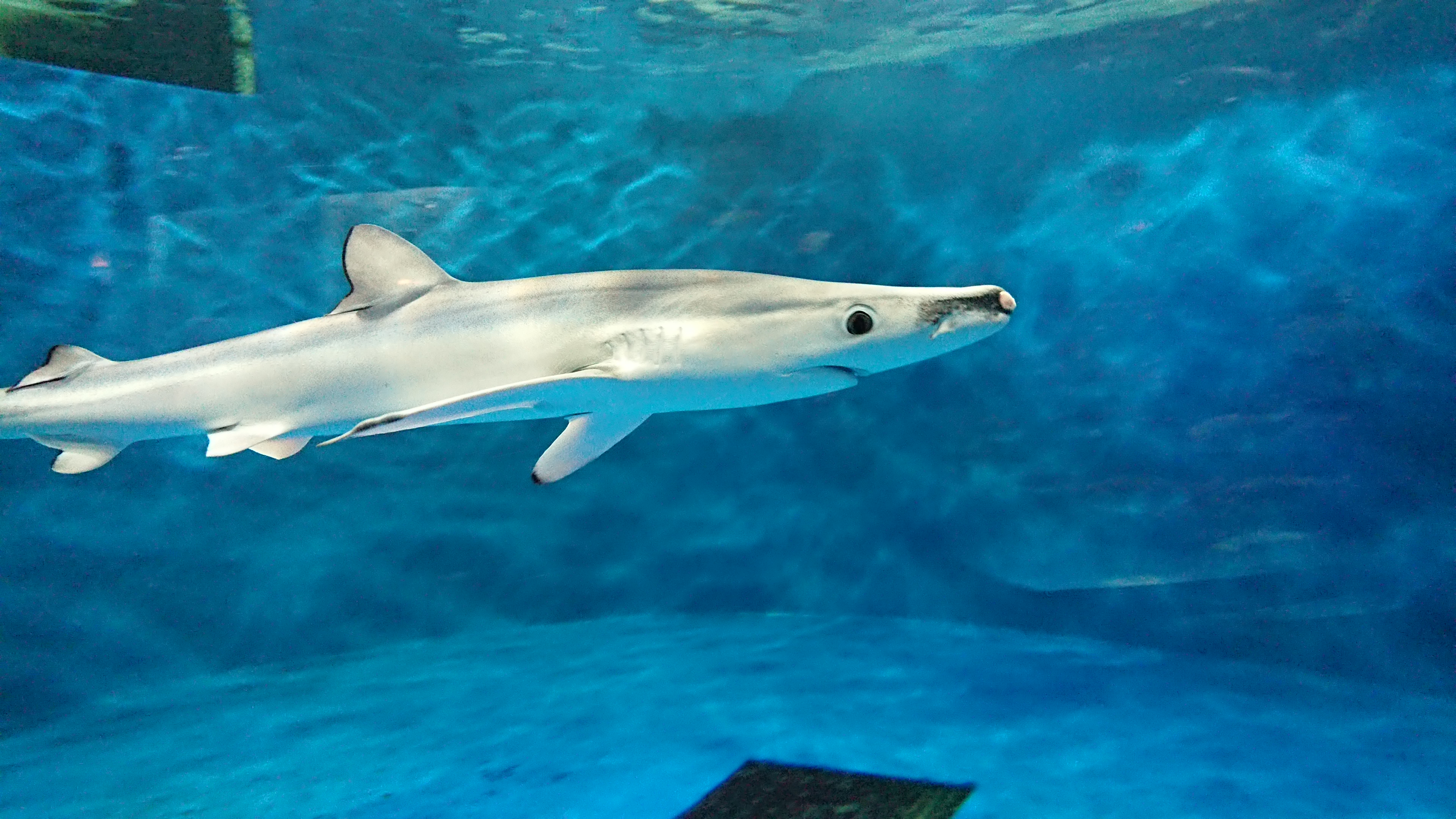
A blue shark at the Sendai Umino-Mori Aquarium, having lived for 367 days in captivity

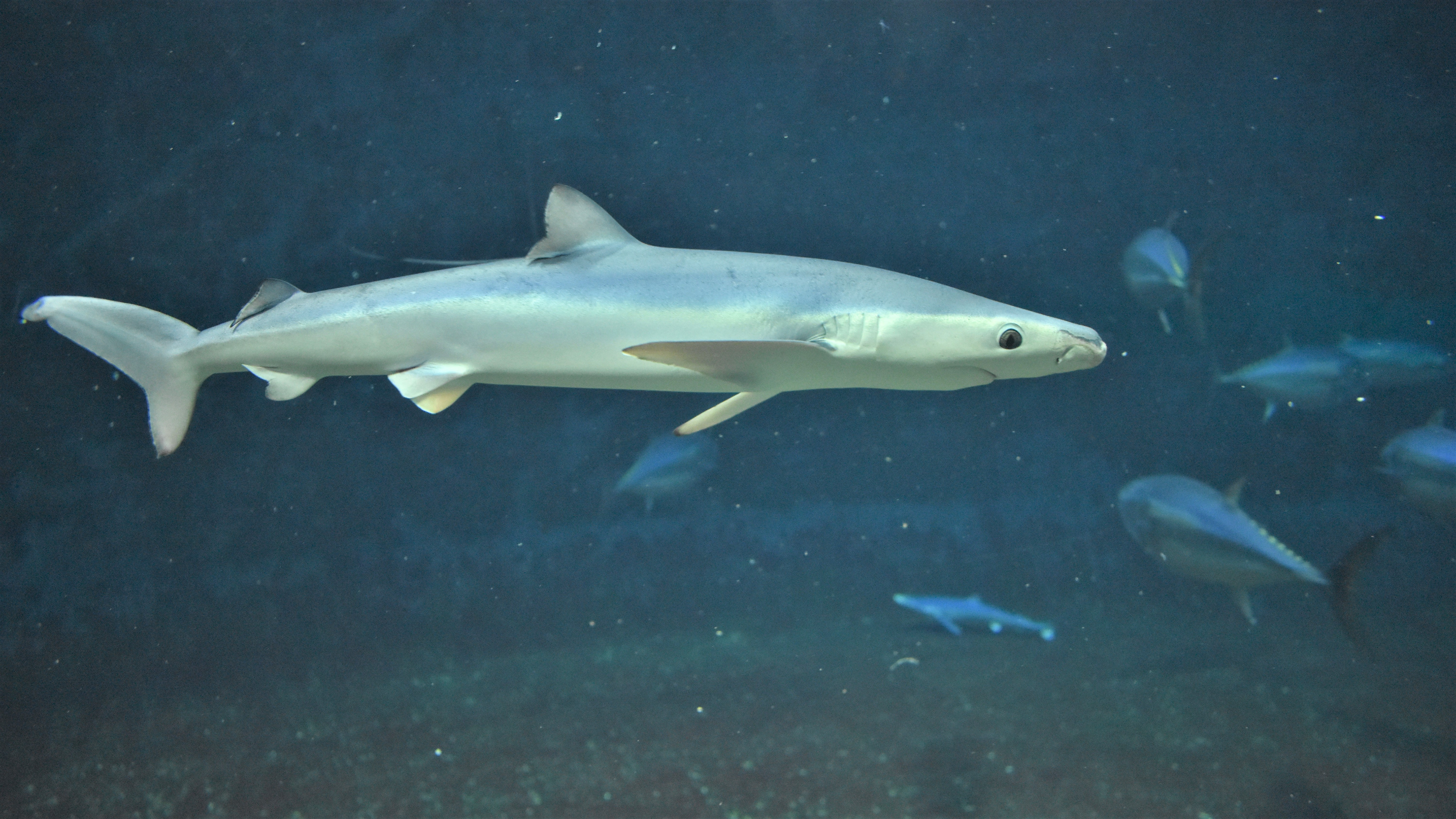
A blue shark at the Tokyo Sea Life Park

Blue sharks, like most pelagic sharks, tend to fare poorly in captivity. The first attempt of keeping blue sharks in captivity was at Sea World San Diego in 1968, and since then a small number of other public aquaria in North America, Europe and Asia have attempted it. Most of these were in captivity for about three months or less, and some of them were released back to the wild afterwards. The record time for blue sharks in captivity is 246 and 224 days for two individuals at Tokyo Sea Life Park, 210 days for an individual at New Jersey Aquarium, and 194 days for one at Lisbon Oceanarium and 252 and 873 days for two individuals at Sendai Umino-Mori Aquarium.

The blue shark that survived the longest in captivity was captured in Shizugawa Bay on 27 July 2018, and taken to the Sendai Umino-Mori Aquarium. The total length at the time of delivery was 51 cm (1.67 ft), the estimated weight was 0.345 kg (0.76 lb), and the age was about 1 year old. After that, it lived for 873 days, but died due to factors such as disordered swimming due to dehydration. At the time of death, the total length was 114 cm (3.74 ft) and the weight was 4 kg (8.8 lb). This growth rate is said to be the same as that of wild blue sharks.

Blue sharks are relatively easy to feed and store in captivity, and the three primary issues appear to be transport, predation by larger sharks and trouble avoiding smooth surfaces in tanks. Small blue sharks, up to 1 m (3.3 ft) long, are relatively easy to transport to aquaria, but it is much more complicated to transport larger individuals. However, this typical small size when introduced to aquaria means that they are highly vulnerable to predation by other sharks that are often kept, such as bull, grey reef, sandbar and sand tiger sharks. For example, several blue sharks kept at Sea World San Diego initially did fairly well, but were eaten when bull sharks were added to their exhibit. Attempts of keeping blue sharks in tanks of various sizes, shapes and depths have shown that they have trouble avoiding walls, aquarium windows and other smooth surfaces, eventually leading to abrasions to the fins or snout, which may result in serious infections. To keep blue sharks, it is therefore necessary with tanks that allow for relatively long, optimum swimming paths where potential contact with smooth surfaces is kept at a minimum. It has been suggested that prominent rockwork may be easier to avoid for blue sharks than smooth surfaces, as has been shown in captive tiger sharks.

== Conservation status ==
Blue sharks make up approximately 85–90% of the total elasmobranchs caught by oceanic fisheries as bycatch. In June 2018 the New Zealand Department of Conservation classified the blue shark as "Not Threatened" with the qualifier "Secure Overseas" under the New Zealand Threat Classification System. The species is listed as Near Threatened by the IUCN.

== See also ==
- Outline of sharks
- List of sharks
- List of prehistoric cartilaginous fish genera
- Blåhaj
