= Arthrobacter globiformis =

Scientific classification
- Domain: Bacteria
- Kingdom: Bacillati
- Phylum: Actinomycetota
- Class: Actinomycetes
- Order: Micrococcales
- Family: Micrococcaceae
- Genus: Arthrobacter
- Species: A. globiformis

Binomial name
- Arthrobacter globiformis corrig. (Conn 1928) Conn and Dimmick 1947 (Approved Lists 1980)

Type strain
- ATCC 8010; BCRC 10598; CCRC 10598; CCUG 12157; CCUG 28997; CCUG 581; CGMCC 1.1894; CIP 81.84; DSM 20124; HAMBI 1863; HAMBI 88; IAM 12438; ICPB 3434; IFO 12137; JCM 1332; LMG 3813; NBRC 12137; NCIB 8907; NCIMB 8907; NRIC 151; NRRL B-2979; VKM Ac-1112

Synonyms
- Corynebacterium globiforme, Mycobacterium globiforme: "Achromobacter globiformis" (Conn 1928) Bergey et al. 1930; Arthrobacter globiforme (Conn 1928) Conn and Dimmick 1947 (Approved Lists 1980); "Bacterium globiforme" Conn 1928; "Corynebacterium globiforme" (Conn 1928) Wood 1950; "Mycobacterium globiforme" (Conn 1928) Krasil'nikov 1941

Species of bacterium

Arthrobacter globiformis is a gram-positive bacterium species from the genus of Arthrobacter.

== Description and Significance ==
Arthrobacter globiformis was first discovered by H. J. Conn in 1928. This bacteria was initially found in large quantities in various types of soil. They start as Gram-negative rods before becoming Gram-positive cocci over time. They may also become large, oval-shaped cells called cystite by growing them in very high carbon to nitrogen ratio environments. These bacteria have cell walls that contain polysaccharides (with monomers glucose, galactose, and rhamnose), peptidoglycan, and phosphorus. They may also have flagella as well. Notably, A. globiformis and its antigens and proteins are commercially available for use in research, food production, biodegradation, and water/wastewater treatment.

== Metabolism ==
A. globiformis can break down substances in the soil such as agricultural chemicals, chromium, etc. They are primarily aerobic, but they can survive anaerobically using lactate, acetate, and ethanol producing fermentation for growth. Most are heterotrophic, meaning they cannot produce their own food. The choline oxidase activity of A. globiformis has been extensively characterized and is important for the production of glycine betaine, one of the few soluble osmotic regulators used by most cells.

== Genome and Genetics ==
The complete genome of A. globiformis has been sequenced using whole-genome shotgun sequencing. The genomes of three strains are available for public use. The genome is approximately 4.89 million base pairs long, containing 4305 proteins and a 66.1% GC content. Two major phylogenetic clades exist within the Arthrobacter genus, the A. globiformis/A. citreus group and the A. nicotianae group. These two clades differ mainly in their peptidoglycan structure, teichoic acid content, and lipid composition.

== See also ==
- Djungelskog (bacteriophage)
