= Punch (monkey) =

Japanese macaque (born 2025)

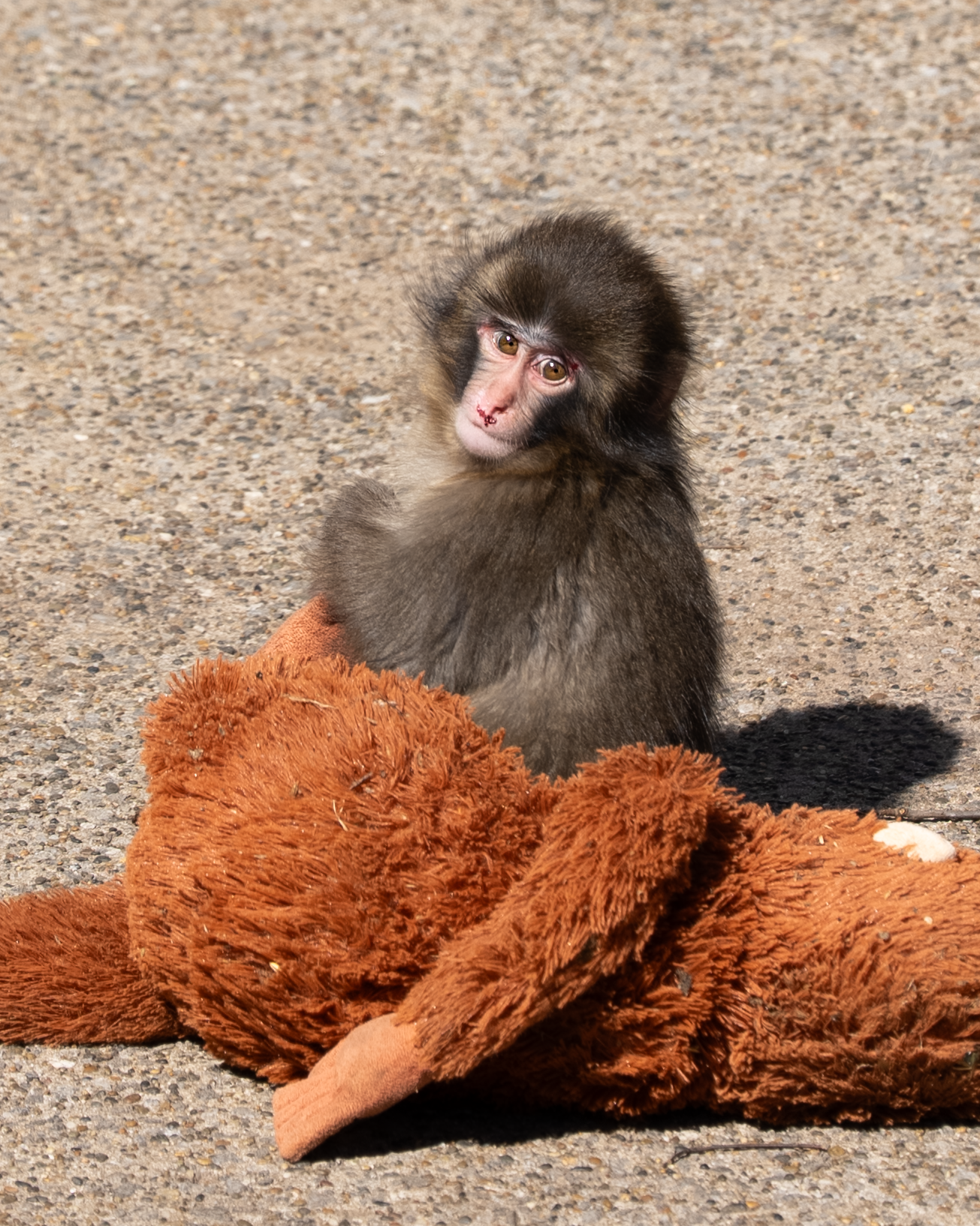
- Punch in March 2026
- Species: Japanese macaque (Macaca fuscata)
- Sex: Male
- Born: July 26, 2025 (age 1); Ichikawa, Chiba, Japan
- Known for: Attachment to stuffed orangutan plushie
- Residence: Ichikawa City Zoo
- Weight: 2 kg (4.4 lb) (February 2026)
- Named after: Monkey Punch

Punch-kun (Japanese: パンチくん, Hepburn: Panchi-kun; born July 26, 2025), or simply Punch, sometimes also referred to as Punch Monkey, is a baby Japanese macaque, or snow monkey, at the Ichikawa City Zoo in Japan. He gained viral attention on social media for his attachment to a large orangutan stuffed toy. Punch's internet popularity led to a surge in visitors to the zoo starting in February 2026.

== Biography ==
Punch was born on July 26, 2025, at the Ichikawa City Zoo. He was named after Monkey Punch, the mangaka who authored Lupin the Third. He was abandoned by his mother, who lacked interest in raising him. Alison Behie, a primatology expert at Australian National University, attributed "age, health and inexperience" as potential factors in mothers abandoning their offspring. Zookeepers have also suggested that Punch was born during a heatwave which is a "high stress environment" for mothers giving birth and they may "prioritise their own health and future reproduction rather than continue to care for an infant whose health may be compromised by those environmental conditions". The following day, he was artificially fed, drinking milk from a baby bottle, and two caretakers began hand-raising him.

Punch was integrated with other macaques at the zoo's Monkey Mountain, with around 60 monkeys, on January 19, 2026. Due to the lack of a maternal figure, Punch initially struggled with socializing, showing "signs of anxiety and isolation". However, one keeper stated that despite occasional ostracizing by other macaques, Punch was "mentally strong". In one viral clip circulated in February, a monkey pushed Punch away. Takashi Yasunaga, head of Ichikawa's zoo and botanical gardens, called Punch-kun "very outgoing". To aid in his socialization and muscle growth, zoo officials gave Punch a Djungelskog orangutan plushie from IKEA, to which he began to cling and treat as a surrogate mother.

As of February 23, 2026, the Ichikawa City Zoo reported that Punch was playing with other monkeys and able to eat without requiring help from a caretaker. On March 5, the zoo announced that Punch was clinging his plushie toy less and had begun to socialize with adult monkeys.

On May 18, 2026, two men were arrested for trespassing into Punch's enclosure to promote cryptocurrency. Punch was unharmed by the incident.

== Reception ==
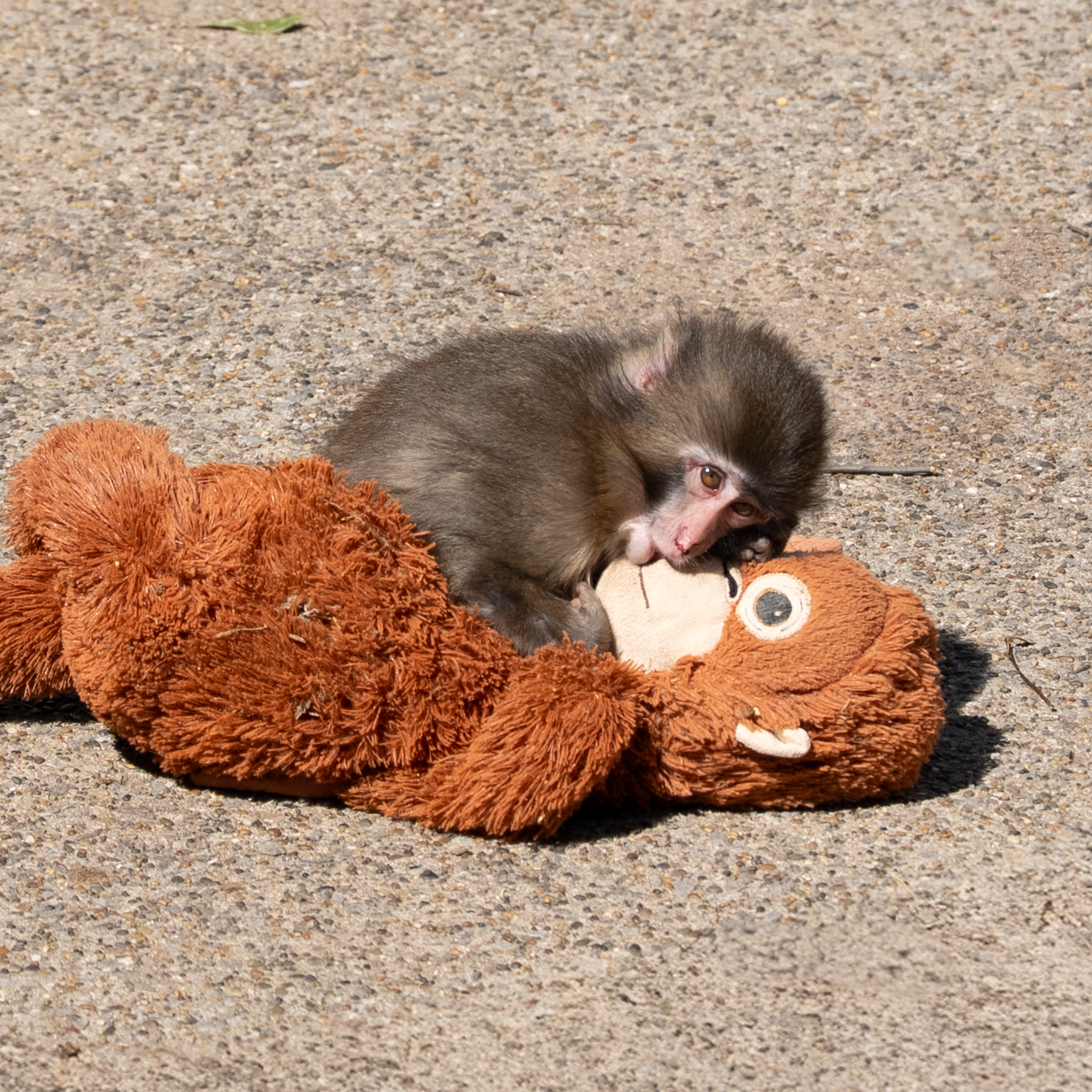
Punch with his orangutan stuffed toy

On February 5, 2026, the zoo made an online post about Punch's backstory, which became an overnight sensation. More images of Punch-kun with the orangutan plushie soon went viral in Japan and abroad, and the hashtag #HangInTherePunch (#がんばれパンチ) began circulating online. Nicknames have also been given to the orangutan plushie itself, such as "Oran-Mama" or "Oran-Mother." Long queues began forming at the Ichikawa City Zoo, which zoo officials considered unprecedented, causing them to apologize for delays in entry. The number of visitors to the zoo in February 2026 doubled from the previous year.

On February 17, IKEA representatives visited the Ichikawa City Zoo and donated 33 stuffed toys to Punch. Sales of the Djungelskog orangutan plushie heavily increased, selling out in the majority of IKEA locations. In March, Blackpink member Lisa visited Punch and posted an Instagram story of her own orangutan plushie from IKEA.

On February 27, Google added a search animation to queries about Punch, showing an animated monkey icon with bright pink hearts. Punch is featured on Roku screensavers.

Social media users expressed sympathy for Punch. Louie Villalobos, writing for USA Today, attributed the popularity of the story to the idea that "Punch reminds us of the loneliness and sadness we've felt in our lives from loss or rejection, and the feeling that maybe we weren't enough. But he is also teaching us that there is always hope through perseverance in the face of rejection." Mary McNamara, writing for the Los Angeles Times, shared that her daughter said "I am Punch and he is me" into her family group chat and argued that it was a commonly held experience "to feel small and bewildered as you circle a social group, seeking a way in, just as everyone knows what it's like to be rejected by those whose approval we seek".

People for the Ethical Treatment of Animals criticized Ichikawa City Zoo over Punch's treatment, arguing that the photo showed the animal's stress and social depression. They called for Punch to be relocated to a wildlife reserve. The group also raised concerns about the premature separation from his mother and the challenges in integrating him with other monkeys, citing potential long-term welfare implications.

In response, Tron founder Justin Sun and HTX donated $100,000 to Ichikawa City Zoo to support Punch's care.

A musical about Punch by Andrew Seok premiered in June 2026 in Toronto.

== See also ==
- Grape-kun
- Jimothy, a raccoon that gained online popularity in 2026
- Moo Deng, a hippopotamus that gained online popularity in 2024
- List of individual monkeys
