= Lufsig =

IKEA plush wolf

Lufsig is a stuffed toy wolf sold at Swedish furniture chain IKEA. The toy, designed by German designer Silke Leffler, is inspired by the fairy tale "Little Red Riding Hood" as a representation of the Big Bad Wolf. The plush was sold as part of IKEA's annual Soft Toys for Education campaign, where the company donates a portion from each toy sold towards various causes. The name "Lufsig" is derived from the Swedish verb "lufsa", meaning "to lumber", and its transliterated Chinese name sounds similar to a profanity when pronounced in Cantonese.

In December 2013, the toy became a symbol of opposition to the Hong Kong government, after an incident during a town hall event where a Lufsig was thrown by a protester at Leung Chun-ying, the Chief Executive, who had been nicknamed "the wolf" by his critics. Following the incident, Lufsig experienced a surge in popularity, selling out at IKEA stores in Hong Kong, as well as at some international outlets.

== Development ==
Lufsig was designed by German designer Silke Leffler, drawing inspiration from the fairy tale Little Red Riding Hood. The toy consists of a wolf, wearing a red checked shirt and braces, and the diminutive grandmother which fits inside the wolf's belly. Lufsig was sold as part of the company's 10th annual Soft Toys for Education campaign, where IKEA would donate a portion of the profit from their stuffed toys and accompanying storybooks sold during the holiday season to UNICEF and Save the Children.

The product was sold as "Lufsig" in Hong Kong and Taiwan, but was named "路姆西" (pinyin: Lù mǔ xi) within mainland China. The name of the toy means "lumbering" in Swedish, as the adjective form of the verb "lufsa". According to IKEA representative Carin Wengelin, the company maintains a naming schema for its products, with woven fabric products named after feminine given names, bathroom products named after Scandinavian lakes, and products for children named after animals, birds, insects or "descriptive words".

== Symbolism in Hong Kong ==
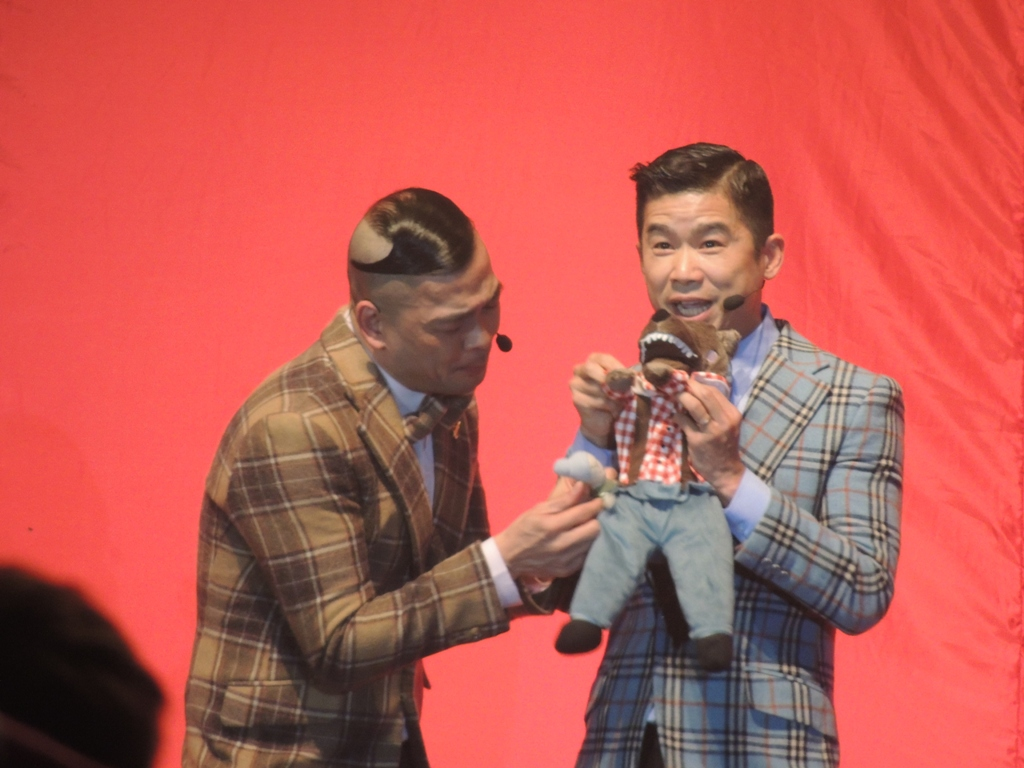
The Hong Kong rap duo Softhard with a Lufsig doll

Leung Chun-ying, the former Chief Executive of Hong Kong, has suffered low popularity ratings since his election in 2012. Of particular criticism was the election process itself, where the new Chief Executive was chosen by the Election Committee, a group of 1200 individuals, many of whom belong to the pro-Beijing camp. The election of Leung, combined with speculation during the campaign that Leung was connected to the Chinese Communist Party, brought about a pro-democracy movement and protests calling for the adoption of universal suffrage in Hong Kong. His approval ratings among citizens reached a record low in December 2013. Leung's critics have nicknamed him "the Wolf", alluding to his perceived cunningness, and as a pun of his surname and the Chinese word for wolf.

On 7 December 2013, during a town hall meeting, a Lufsig plush toy was thrown at Leung by an anti-government protester. Following the incident, it was also discovered that the transliteration of Lufsig's name as listed on IKEA's mainland Chinese website, "路姆西" (pronounced as louh móuh sāi in Cantonese), could be misinterpreted as profanity; in particular, louh móuh sāi could be read as a pun on lóuh móu hāi ("老母閪", lit. "mother's vagina"), and that the expression "丟你路姆西" (dīu néih louh móuh sāi, lit. "throw your Lufsig" or "throw a Lufsig at you"), could be a pun on the vulgar phrase "𨳒你老母閪" (díu néih lóuh móu hāi), which can be translated as "fuck your mother's vagina."

Following the incident, Lufsig experienced a surge in popularity in Hong Kong; people lined up outside IKEA's three Hong Kong locations the next morning to purchase the toy, which were sold out within hours. The popularity soon extended overseas. In China, buyers flipped Lufsig dolls for a quick profit, with some Taobao sellers selling the toy for CN¥ 188, up from the official price of CN¥ 59 in Chinese IKEA stores. In Canada, the toy went out of stock at several Toronto- and Vancouver-area IKEA stores. Buying frenzies were also sparked in Taipei and Singapore. A Lufsig Facebook page amassed over 50,000 likes, and Lufsigs were being put up for sale in auctions for a symbolic HK$689 – 689 being the number of votes Leung received in the election.

On 11 December 2013, Leung posted a picture of himself with a Lufsig he bought as a Christmas present for his daughter, and praised the "creativity" of Hong Kong people. IKEA called the unintended pun "unfortunate" the same day, and changed the official Chinese name to "路福西" (pronounced as "Lufuxi" in Putonghua and as "louh fūk sāi" in Cantonese), incorporating a Chinese character meaning "good fortune".

== See also ==
- Blåhaj
- Djungelskog
