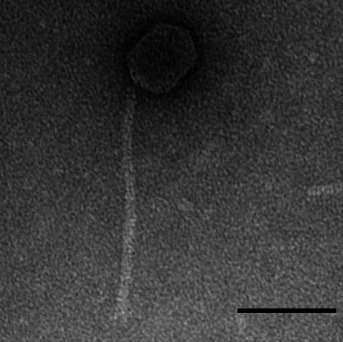
- Djungelskog (scale bar = 100 nm)

Virus classification
- (unranked): Virus
- Realm: Duplodnaviria
- Kingdom: Heunggongvirae
- Phylum: Uroviricota
- Class: Caudoviricetes
- Virus: Bacteriophage Djungelskog

= Djungelskog (bacteriophage) =

Bacteriophage Djungelskog

Bacteriophage

Djungelskog (Swedish pronunciation: [ˈjɵ̂ŋːɛlːˌskuːɡ]) is a bacteriophage that infects Arthrobacter globiformis. It was discovered by students at Marist University in 2022 by isolating it from degraded organic material found in Poughkeepsie, New York. It was initially named "SharkoochyBord", but the name was rejected, so it was renamed in honor of the Djungelskog toy produced by IKEA.

== See also ==
- PhagesDB
- Phagemid
