= Djungelskog =

Plush toy produced by IKEA

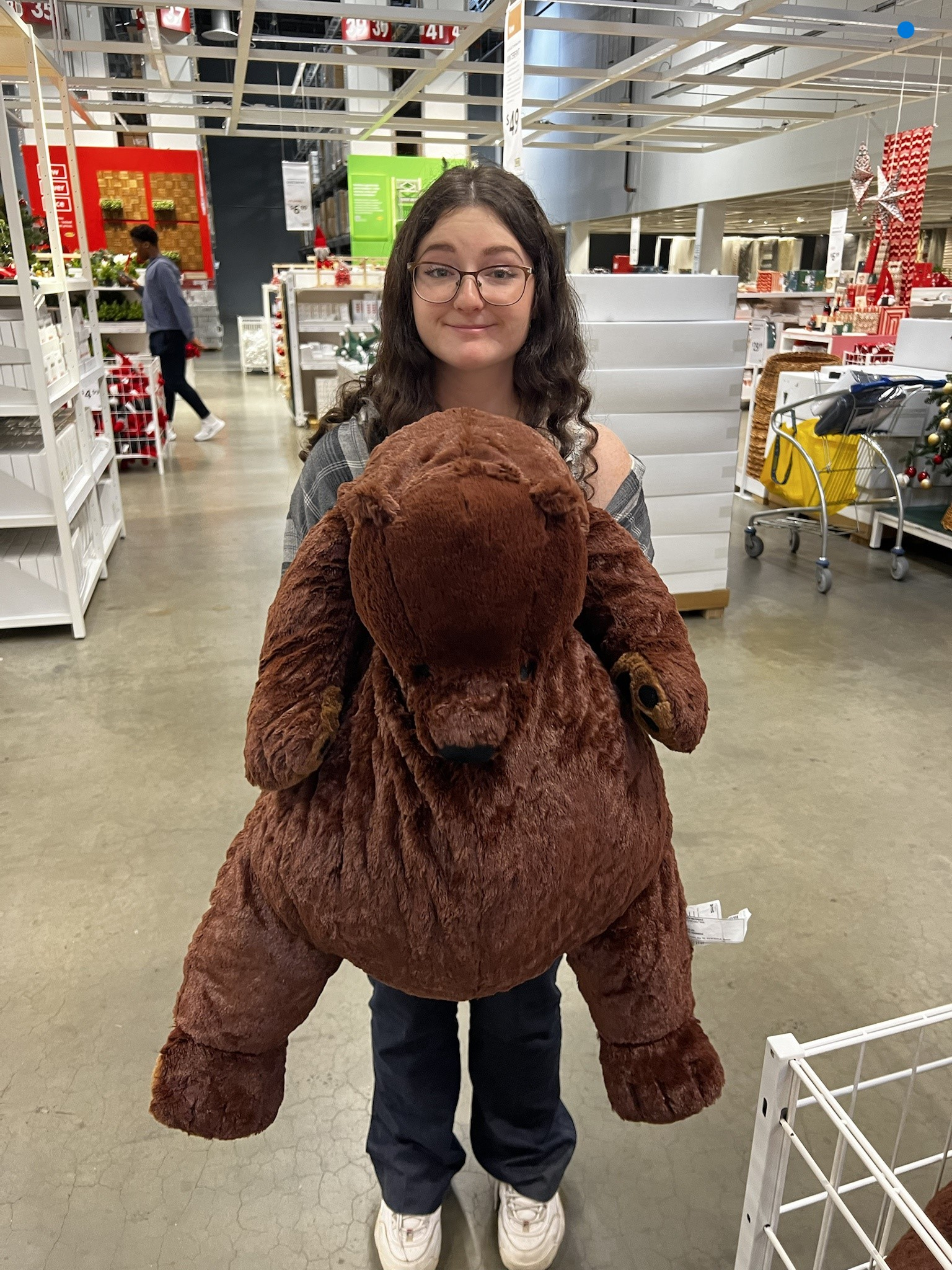
- Comparison of Djungelskog's size with a human
- Type: Soft toy
- Invented by: IKEA of Sweden
- Company: IKEA
- Availability: 2018–present
- Materials: Polyester
- Official website

Djungelskog (stylised in all caps; Swedish pronunciation: [ˈjɵ̂ŋːɛlːˌskuːɡ], lit. 'jungle forest') is a brand of stuffed toy manufactured and sold by the Swedish furniture and home goods store IKEA. It is one of the most popular stuffed toys sold by the company alongside the stuffed shark Blåhaj.

== Physical description ==
The most popular Djungelskog toy is a 100-centimetre (39 in) long brown bear weighing 1.20 kg (2.6 lb) with a width of 61 cm (24 in) and height of 16 cm (6 in). Other variants include a 70-centimetre (28 in) lion, a 66-centimetre (26 in) orangutan, a 47-centimetre (19 in) panda, a smaller 28-centimetre (11 in) brown bear, and assorted 17-centimetre (6.7 in) animals. It was originally designed for children aged 3 to 7 years old.

== History ==
The stuffed bear was released in April 2018, alongside a series of jungle-themed items with the same name. It was initially available in Europe, Australia and Japan, but was not sold in the United States. IKEA later released the collection in the US in July 2023 due to its high demand. Although the soft toy was already highly coveted and popular, the release of the stuffed animal in the US further boosted its popularity. It became a best-selling item and had "sales five times higher than expected", according to the head of home furnishing for children for IKEA. It has sustained a following on social media sites such as Reddit and X. Some social media users dress the stuffed animal in different clothes.

In 2022, a bacteriophage found by students at Marist University was named after Djungelskog.

In 2026, an orphaned baby Japanese macaque named Punch-kun at the city zoo in Ichikawa, Chiba was given an orangutan Djungelskog to help combat his anxiety and isolation. Punch-kun began treating the toy as a surrogate mother and became a viral Internet meme for this behavior. On February 17, IKEA representatives visited the Ichikawa City Zoo and donated 33 stuffed toys to Punch.

== Gallery ==
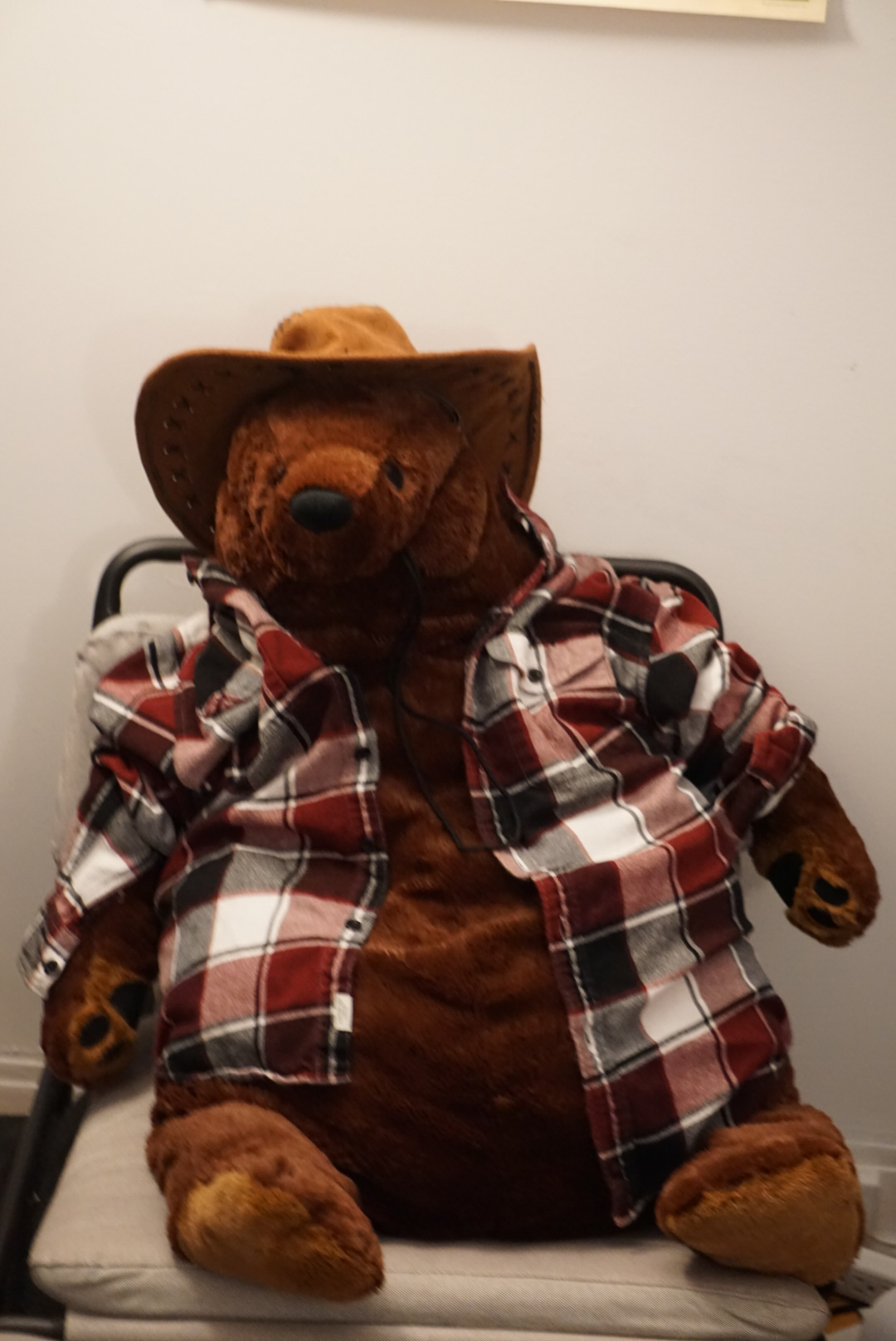
Djungelskog bear wearing a cowboy hat and flannel

Djungelskog orangutan sitting on a blue chair

== See also ==
- Blåhaj
- Lufsig
