= 2021 Swiss same-sex marriage referendum =

26 September 2021 national referendum in Switzerland

- 26 September 2021
- Amendment to the Swiss Civil Code (Marriage for All)

Results
Choice	Votes	%
Yes	1,828,642	64.10%
No	1,024,307	35.90%
Valid votes	2,852,949	98.27%
Invalid or blank votes	50,279	1.73%
Total votes	2,903,228	100.00%
Registered voters/turnout	5,519,168	52.6%
- Results by canton

The 2021 Swiss same-sex marriage referendum was a facultative referendum held in Switzerland on 26 September 2021 about an amendment to the Civil Code to legalise marriage between people of the same sex, as well as adoption rights for same-sex couples and access to assisted reproductive technology for women couples. The amendment was called "marriage for all" (Ehe für alle, Mariage pour tous, Matrimonio per tutti, Lètg per tuts) in Swiss public discourse.

64.1% of voters and all cantons supported the amendment, which entered into force on 1 July 2022. The vote made Switzerland the 30th country to legalise same-sex marriage. When the vote took place, Switzerland was one of few countries in Western Europe yet to grant same-sex couples the right to marry.

== Purpose ==
The amendment subject to the referendum legalises same-sex marriage in Switzerland, adoption by same-sex couples and assisted reproductive technology for female same-sex couples. Same-sex couples who have entered into a registered partnership (introduced in 2005) may maintain it or convert it into a marriage. However, the introduction of same-sex marriage eliminates the possibility of entering into a registered partnership.

== History ==
Switzerland allows its citizens to launch a facultative referendum to contest a law adopted by the Swiss Federal Assembly, the federal parliament. In order to qualify, the petition must have at least 50,000 signatures within 100 days after the publication of the new law in the Federal Gazette. The evangelical Christian party Federal Democratic Union of Switzerland (EDU) had already announced in June 2020 that they would launch a referendum against the legalisation of same-sex marriage.

After lengthy discussions, initiated by a 2013 bill by the Green Liberal Party of Switzerland, the Federal Assembly adopted a bill for the legalisation of same-sex marriage in 2020. It was supported by the federal government and all political parties, except most of the right-wing Swiss People's Party, about half of the Centre party, and the EDU. The amendment to the Civil Code was published in the Federal Gazette on 31 December 2020, leaving opponents to collect signatures against the law until 10 April 2021.

There were three referendum committees. The first, by the EDU, called itself "No to marriage for all". The second, by members of parliament from the Swiss People's Party (SVP), the Centre and the Evangelical People's Party of Switzerland was called "No to sperm donation for same-sex couples". A third committee called "No to the commodification of children" was launched by members of parliament of the SVP from the Canton of Valais; they also called themselves "For the Family Foundation".

On 12 April 2021, opponents of same-sex marriage announced that they had collected 59,176 certified signatures and brought them to the Federal Chancellery. On 27 April, the Chancellery certified 61,027 valid signatures, which meant that the law would be submitted to a vote. On 19 May, the Federal Council decided that the referendum would take place on 26 September 2021.

In the discussions leading up to the vote, the proponents of equal marriage including the federal minister of justice, Karin Keller-Sutter, highlighted the need to end discrimination and inequality; they said that the law would be a step towards ending the stigmatization and social discrimination against same-sex couples. The opponents of the amendment, primarily from conservative circles, advanced the argument of respecting tradition; they also said that changing the definition of marriage would need a constitutional rather than statutory amendment. But their principal arguments related to child welfare, such as the right of a child to know one's father, which they said would be in jeopardy for the children of female same-sex couples.

Switzerland - National Parliamentary Political Parties' Positions on the 26 September 2021 referendums (Marriage For All Act)
Party	Position on how to vote
Swiss People's Party (UDC/SVP)	No
Social Democratic Party (PS/SP)	Yes
FDP.The Liberals (PLR/FDP)	Yes
Green Party (PES/GPS)	Yes
The Centre (LC/DW)	Yes
Green Liberal Party (PVL/GLP)	Yes
Evangelical People's Party (PEV/EVP)	No
Federal Democratic Union (UDF/EDU)	No
Ticino League (Lega)	Neutral
Solidarity (solidaritéS)	Yes
Swiss Party of Labour (POP/PdA)	Yes

== Opinion polls ==
Polls in advance of the referendum consistently showed roughly two-thirds support for the law.

Pollster	Commissioned by	Date	Yes	Rather yes	Undecided No response	Rather not	No
gfs.Bern	SRG SSR	20 August 2021	55	14	2	9	20
LeeWas GmbH	Tamedia	13 August 2021	56	8	1	6	29
LeeWas GmbH	Tamedia	1 September 2021	60	6	1	4	29
gfs.Bern	SRG SSR	15 September 2021	53	10	2	8	27
LeeWas GmbH	Tamedia	15 September 2021	64	3	1	3	29

== Results ==
64.10% of voters and all cantons supported the amendment to the Civil Code to legalise same-sex marriage.

Amendment to the Swiss Civil Code (Marriage for All).
Choice	Votes	%
For	1,828,642	64.10
Against	1,024,307	35.90
Total	2,852,949	100.00
Valid votes	2,852,949	98.27
Invalid/blank votes	50,279	1.73
Total votes	2,903,228	100.00
Registered voters/turnout	5,519,168	52.60

== Reactions ==
=== Support ===
Laura Russo, co-president of the Geneva Federation of LGBT Associations, said, "This is a historic day for us and for Switzerland, this is a great step forward, something we have been waiting for for years." Pink Cross, a Swiss LGBTQ umbrella organization, praised the vote and called it a "big milestone".

In a press release after the vote, the Umbrella Association of Rainbow Families wrote about the effects of opposition to marriage equality on its members.

=== Opposition ===
Verena Herzog, The SVP's national councilor, criticized the law for "[opening] the floodgates to many potentially dangerous practices,” although these were not specified. Speaking to Keystone-SDA, Monika Rüegger of the SVP said it was a "black day" in response to the vote.
