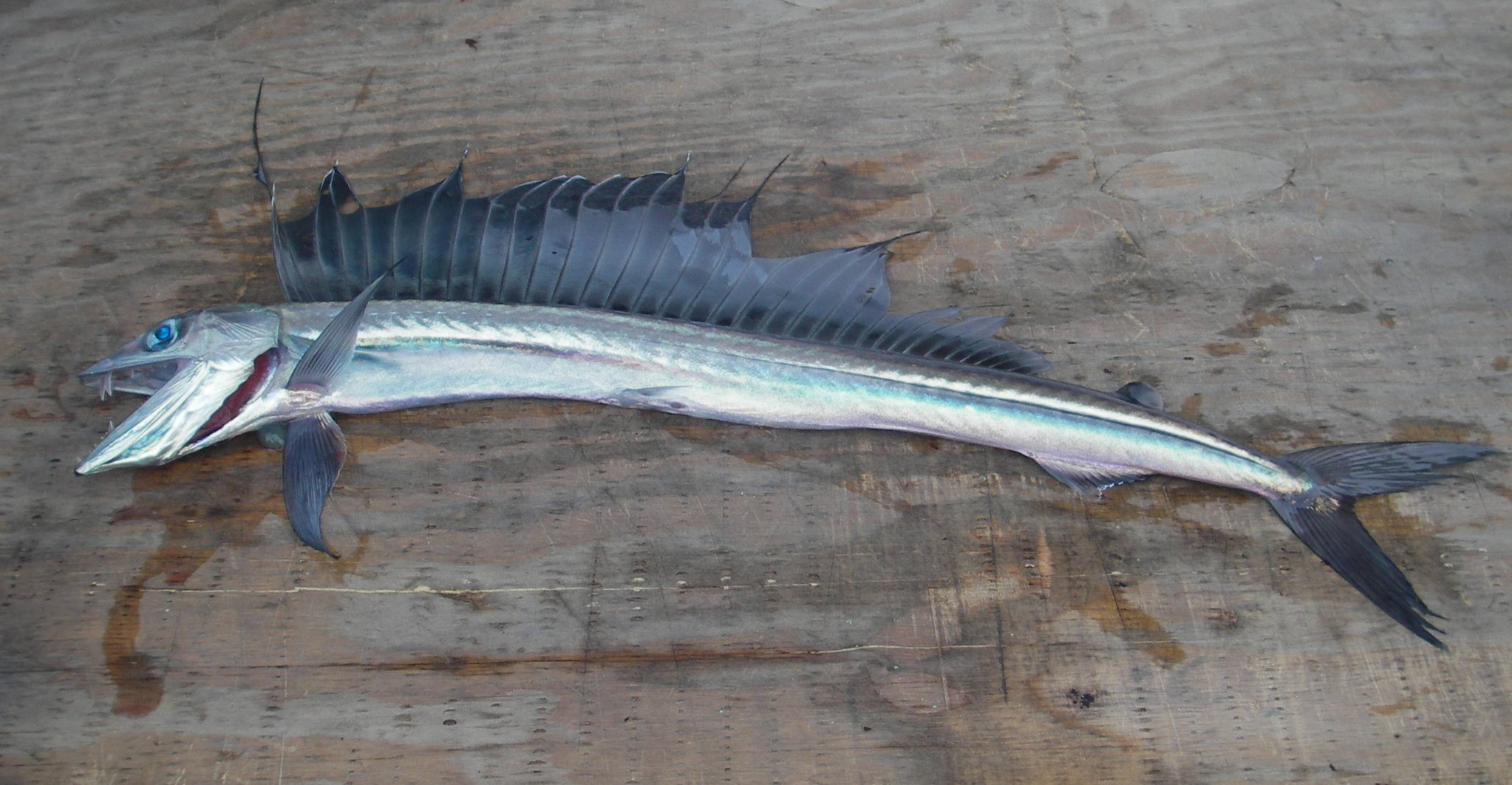

Conservation status
- Least Concern (IUCN 3.1)

- Secure (NatureServe)

Scientific classification
- Kingdom: Animalia
- Phylum: Chordata
- Class: Actinopterygii
- Order: Aulopiformes
- Family: Alepisauridae
- Genus: Alepisaurus
- Species: A. ferox

Binomial name
- Alepisaurus ferox R. T. Lowe, 1833

= Alepisaurus ferox =

Longnose lancetfish

Species of fish

Alepisaurus ferox, also known as the long snouted lancetfish, longnose lancetfish, or cannibal fish, is a species of lancetfish found in the ocean depths down to 1,830 m (6,000 ft). This species grows to 215 cm (85 in) in total length and a weight of 9 kg (20 lb).

The appellation cannibal fish stems from discoveries of partially-digested conspecifics in captured specimens.

== Habitat and ecosystem ==
=== Habitat ===
A. ferox lives in deep water oceans in the Western and Eastern Pacific, from the Aleutian Islands to Chile; the Western Atlantic, from the Gulf of Maine to the Gulf of Mexico, including the Caribbean Sea; in addition to the Northwest & Eastern Atlantic, Indian Ocean and China Sea. The longnose lancetfish can also be found as far north as Russia. This expansive geographic reach has caused for the species to be accidentally caught by some tuna fisheries. Daily vertical migrations from the epipelagic all the way down to the mesopelagic or bathypelagic zones are undertaken to find food.

=== Predators ===
The known predators for A. ferox include yellowfin tuna, opah, fur seals, Pacific cod, and salmon shark. Predators are known to change depending on the ocean region.

=== Effect on ecosystem ===
A. ferox is known for its predatory and prey behaviors in the south-western and central-western Pacific Ocean. In such regions, studies have been conducted to investigate the effects the longnose lancetfish has on the surrounding ecosystems—and whether those impacts are negative or positive for said ecosystems. When A. ferox was removed from these regions of the Pacific Ocean, there was a negative effect on the ecosystems that showed the importance of this species as both a predatory and prey type.

== Characteristics and behavior ==
=== Appearance ===
The dorsal fin has about three rays strongly exerted, beginning with the third or fourth ray. It is known to have a large mouth with two fangs. It is generally pale, iridescent, and dark around the dorsal fin; all of its fins are either dark brown or black.

The stomach of A. ferox is similar to that of the other species in the suborder of Alepisauroidea. The gut of the A. ferox is a large, blind-sac that also has a unique biological response to food. The stomach will store food in the stomach and slowly digest the contents, allowing for a more in depth understanding of the exact diet the A. ferox have.

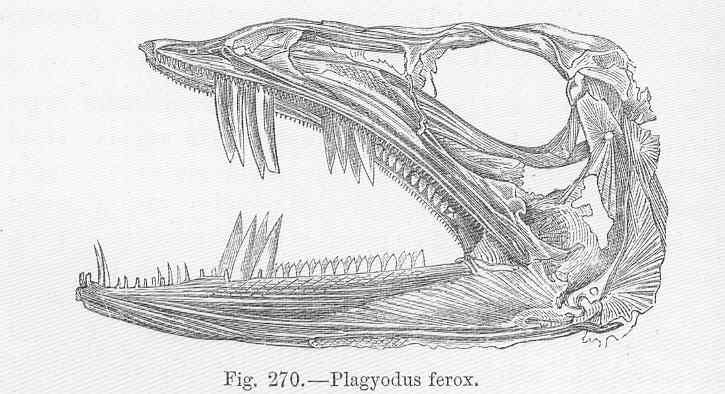
Skull of A. ferox.

The large, sharp teeth of the lancetfish have two functions; breaking apart organisms too large to swallow whole and cutting trunk muscles to inhibit struggling. The teeth are not used for chewing otherwise.

=== Diet ===
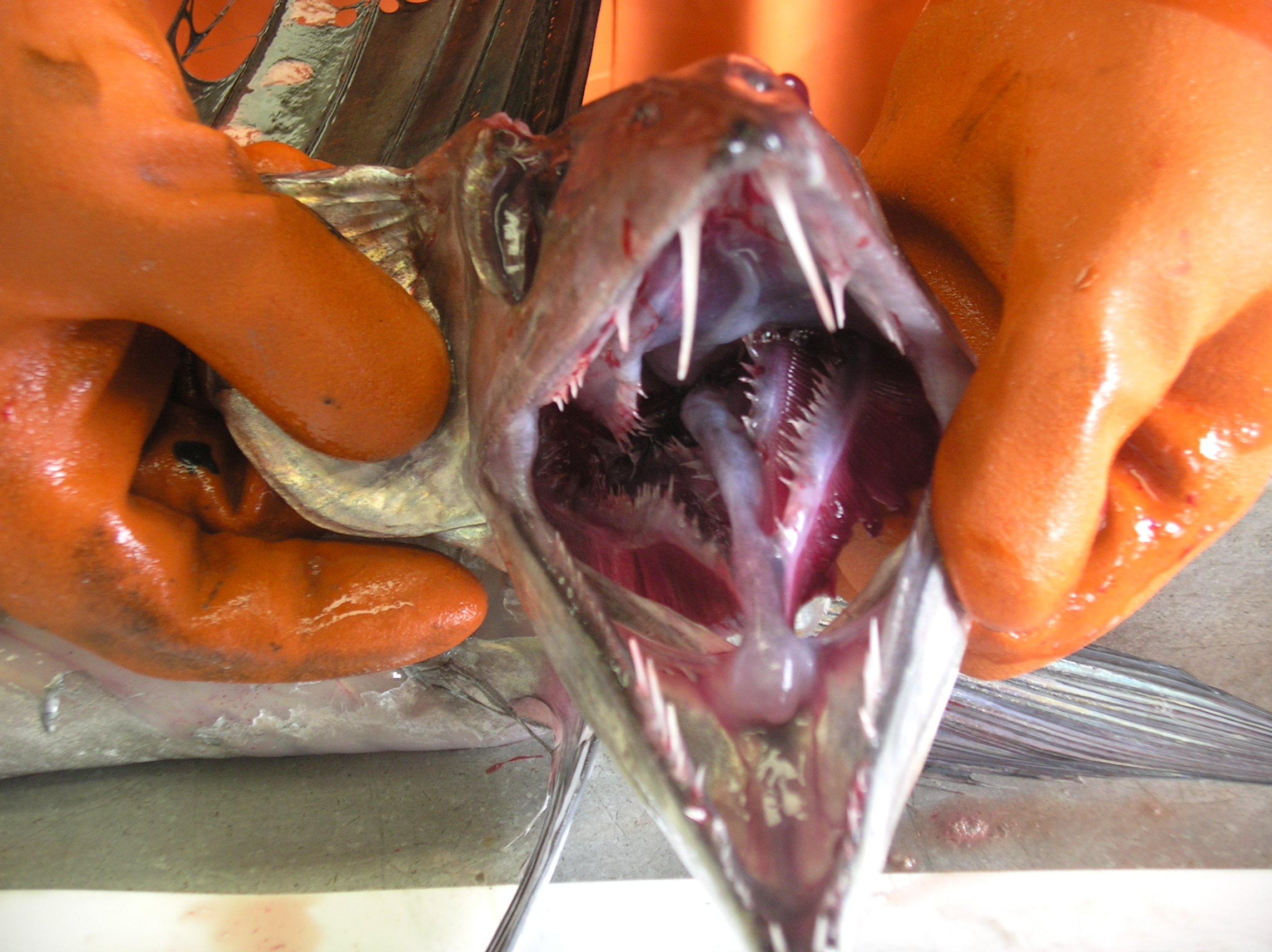
Inside of mouth

Longnose lancetfish diet varies depending on its inhabited area. Studies of diet variation have produced inconsistent results. They are known to prey on 98 component families; individuals may even consume man made materials, such as plastic.

The longnose lancetfish is a migratory predator. It is known to travel to a depth of 1,830 m (6,000 ft) in order to hunt. A study in Suruga Bay, Japan, investigated the stomach contents of various specimens that had washed ashore and found, along with indigestible materials, traces of marine species of the photic and aphotic zones. This study showed that the longnose lancetfish is a deep sea diving species capable of migrating across different sea depths.

As aforementioned, the longnose lancetfish is referred to as the cannibal fish due to its conspecific predation habits. The extent of cannibalistic behavior depends on the availability of non-conspecific prey, with frequency of these patterns ranging from 0 to 45.5%. Such is contingent upon the availability and ease of finding other prey. Size is an influencing factor; small lancetfish will not resort to cannibalism as quickly as larger fish.

=== Reproduction ===
The fish are hermaphroditic: they have both male and female reproductive parts at the same time. Unlike other hermaphroditic fishes, A. ferox has two distinct testicular lobes that are independent from the ovarian region. This species also has an absence of a pair of diverticulae in the female reproductive section, which in other hermaphrodites is used for spermatophore uptake.

== Human impact ==
=== Plastic consumption ===
Plastic is ingested by approximately 30% of all A. ferox. Macroplastic fragments and rope fragments were the most commonly found plastic in the stomach contents with white and clear colored plastics seeming to be favored.

=== Bycatch ===
A. ferox is commonly caught as bycatch for longline fisheries and is never the intended target. In the Philippines, studies of longline tuna fisheries revealed that they usually caught more A. ferox than any tuna. A. ferox also accounts for 2% of all bycatch by circle and j hook longline fisheries in the Bay of Bengal. Survival of being bycatch in these types of nets is low — only one third of A. ferox survive.
