= Fullerton Avenue =

Major east-west street in Chicago, Illinois, U.S.

- Alexander N. Fullerton Memorial Parkway; Fullerton Parkway; 2400 North
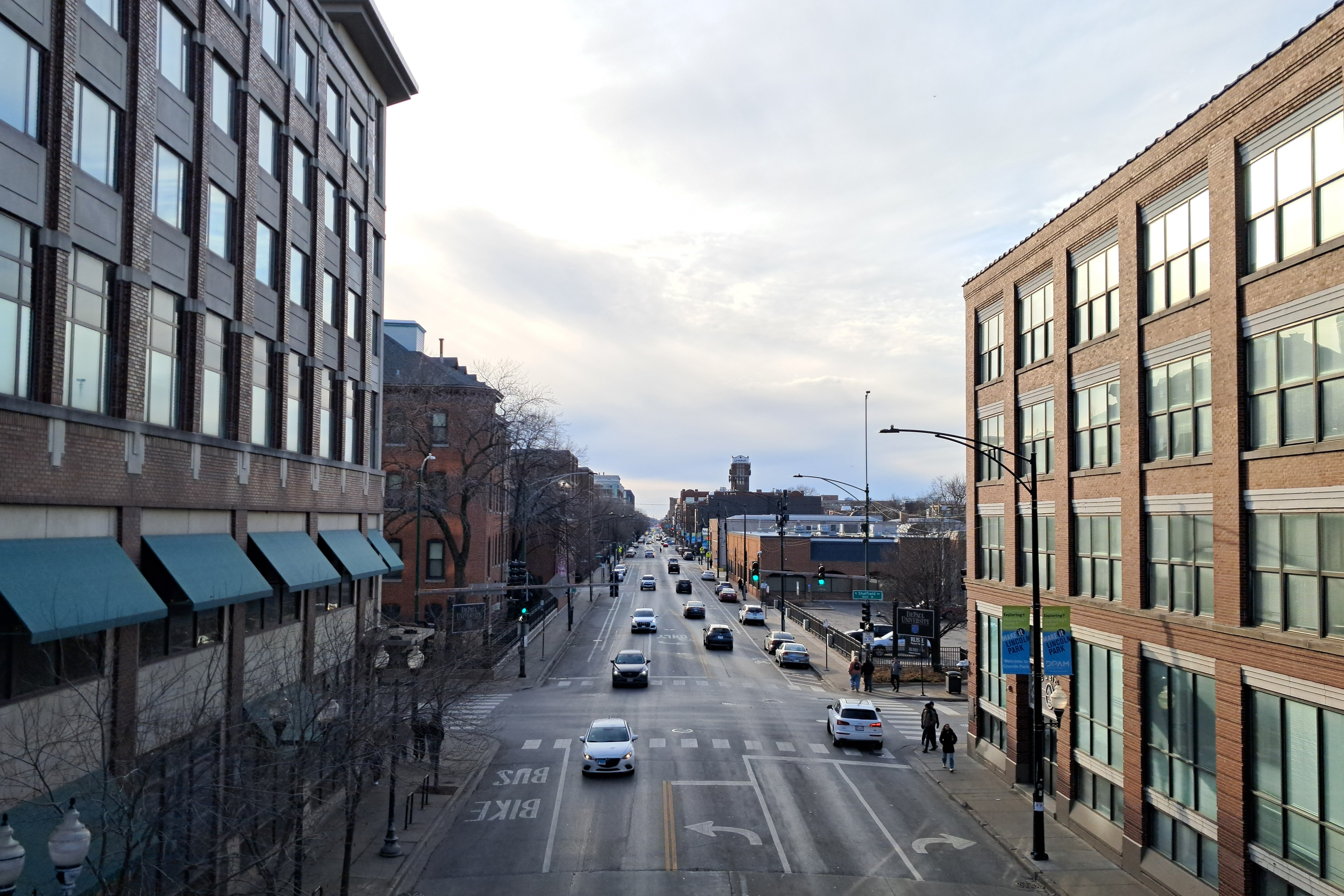
- Fullerton Avenue at Sheffield Avenue, 2026
- Length: 21.32 mi (34.31 km)
- Location: Chicago, Elmwood Park, River Grove, Franklin Park, Northlake, Elmhurst, Addison, Glendale Heights, Carol Stream
- West end: Gary Avenue in Carol Stream
- East end: US 41 (Lake Shore Drive) in Chicago

Fullerton Avenue, known as Fullerton Parkway from its intersection with Halsted Street and Lincoln Avenue to its east end, is a major east–west street in Chicago (2400 N) and its western suburbs. Its west end is at Gary Avenue in Carol Stream. The road is split in many locations, usually because of freeways or railroads. Its east end is located at U.S. Route 41 (Lake Shore Drive) in Chicago.

== Route description ==
=== Gary Avenue to Harlem Avenue ===
Fullerton Avenue begins at Gary Avenue in Carol Stream. It continues east for 3.49 miles (5.62 km), until turning south as Liberty Drive in Glendale Heights.

The second segment of the road, located in Lombard, begins at Swift Road, continuing east for 0.18 miles (0.29 km) until turning south as Helen Street.

The third segment of Fullerton Avenue begins as a continuation of Collins Avenue. The road switch occurs under Interstate 355 (Veterans Memorial Tollway). All 3.54 miles (5.70 km) of this segment is located in Addison. The road continues east from under the Veterans Memorial Tollway, intersecting Illinois Route 53 (Rohlwing Road) just east of the tollway, until ending at Central Avenue.

The next segment of the road is a 0.21 miles (0.34 km) minor road from Church Road to Oaklawn Avenue in Elmhurst.

The fifth segment of Fullerton Avenue runs for 0.75 miles (1.21 km), also in Elmhurst. It begins at York Road and ends at Parker Street.

The sixth segment of the road is located in Melrose Park and Franklin Park. It runs 2.40 miles (3.86 km) from King Arthur Drive and Jerome Drive in Melrose Park to a cul-de-sac east of 25th Avenue. On this segment, Fullerton Avenue intersects U.S. Route 12/U.S. Route 45 (Mannheim Road).

The Soo Line Railroad splits the sixth and seventh segments. The seventh segment begins at a cul-de-sac in Franklin Park. It runs for 0.90 miles (1.45 km) en route to its terminus at Des Plaines River Road in River Grove.

The eighth segment of Fullerton Avenue runs from Maple Street in River Grove, intersecting Illinois Route 171 (1st Avenue) on its way to its east end at Illinois Route 43 (Harlem Avenue) in Elmwood Park. This section of Fullerton Avenue is 1.69 miles (2.72 km) long.

=== Grand Avenue to Lake Shore Drive ===
The ninth and final segment is the longest section of Fullerton Avenue, being 7.9 miles (12.71 km) long. At Chicago's western border, the straight road at 2400N (which otherwise would be Fullerton) is instead signed as Grand Avenue, which runs from the city border at Harlem eastward to just west of Natchez Avenue, where it breaks the grid and becomes diagonal. Therefore, Fullerton's longest segment begins where Grand Avenue turns south. Fullerton, restored, continues due east, intersecting major streets, such as Illinois Route 50 (Cicero Avenue), Pulaski Road, Kedzie Avenue, Milwaukee Avenue, and Western Avenue. Just east of Western Avenue, Fullerton Avenue intersects Interstates 90 and 94 (Kennedy Expressway). East of the expressway, the road intersects Elston Avenue and then crosses the North Branch of the Chicago River. Further east, Fullerton Avenue intersects Sheffield Avenue. Continuing east, the road intersects Halsted Street and Lincoln Avenue at the same point. Next, the road intersects Clark Street. Finally, Fullerton Avenue (known as Fullerton Parkway from Halsted/Lincoln to its east end), ends at U.S. Route 41 (Lake Shore Drive) in Lincoln Park.

== Transportation ==
Fullerton Avenue is primarily served by the 74 Fullerton bus route from Grand Avenue to Halsted Street. The bus route travels further west along Grand Avenue to a bus turnaround at Nordica Avenue.

The Red Line, Brown Line and Purple Line Express has a station at Sheffield Avenue. The Milwaukee District North Line's Healy station is at Fullerton Avenue and Pulaski Road.

== See also ==
- Our Lady of the Underpass
