= Squirrels on college campuses =

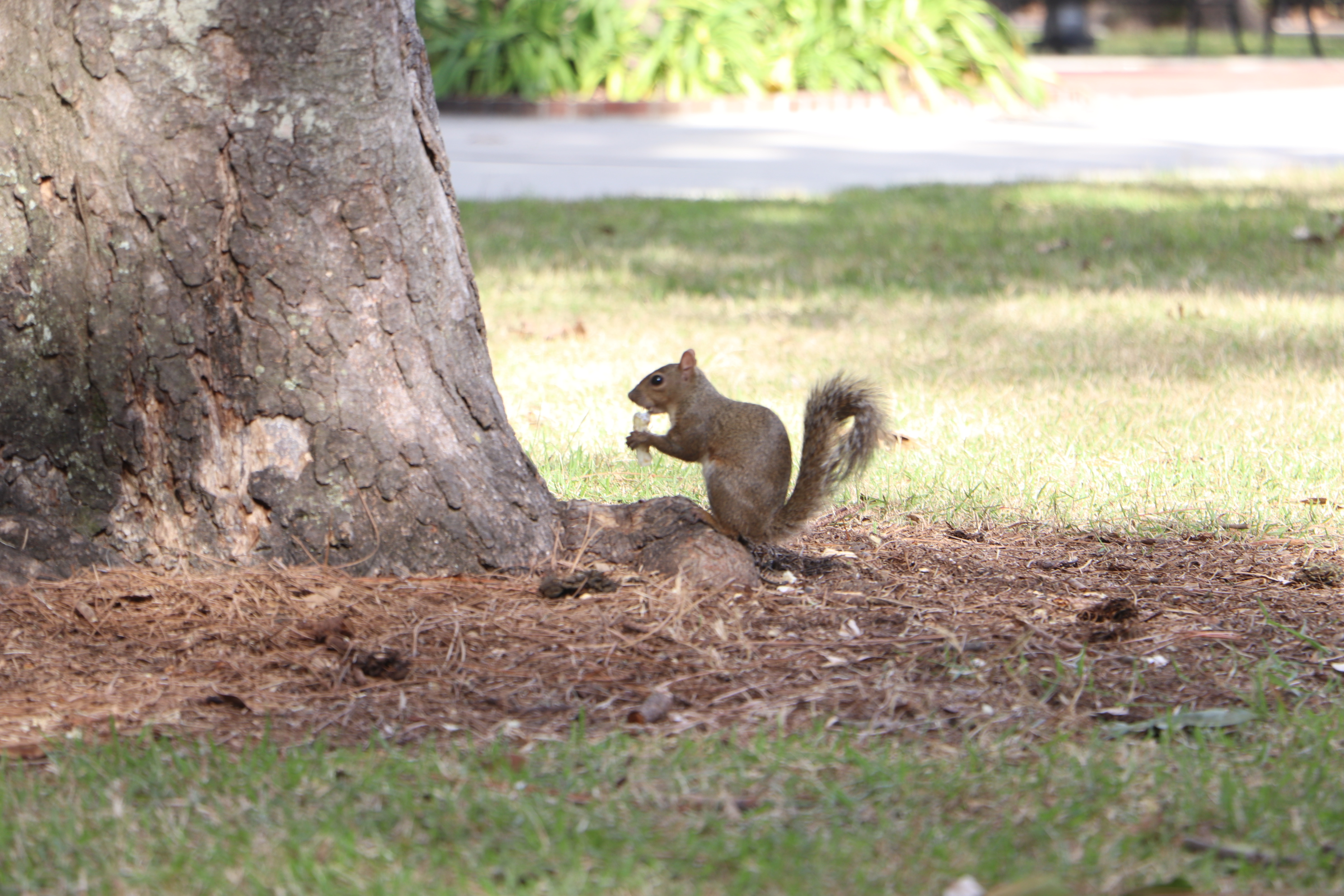
Squirrel seen on a campus of the University of Florida in 2021

Tree squirrels are commonly found on the campuses of colleges and universities in North America, particularly in the United States. Though often cited as a U.S. phenomenon and researched in regard to North American contexts, European and Asian college campuses have been known to be inhabited by squirrels as well.

Student response to such populations is mixed, with some amused by the squirrels and considering them a core and positive aspect of campus culture, and other students considering the squirrels to be aggressive and a nuisance.

== History and response from students ==
Squirrels on college campuses have long been cited as a phenomenon; student newspaper articles often address campus squirrels with a sentiment of amusement, though some students view the squirrels as a nuisance, citing their aggressive or scary attitudes. One of the earliest records of the phenomenon is The Harvard Crimson documenting one student having been attacked by a squirrel in his dorm room in 1938. "Selecting a College: The Squirrel Index" was a 1993 article published in The Journal of Irreproducible Results, as "a humorous guide encouraging students to select the college with the most and friendliest squirrels." Princeton University is another institution with a documented squirrel population, with conflicting student folklore having developed to explain the abundance of black squirrels on campus. One such myth purported that a biology experiment produced a breed of black squirrels, though this was debunked by Princeton's Weekly Bulletin in 1999. Another folk story explaining Princeton's squirrels suggests that Moses Taylor Pyne introduced black and orange squirrels to match the university's colors.

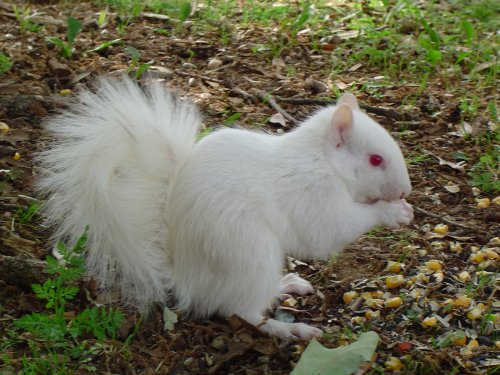
An albino squirrel on campus at the University of North Texas

Albino populations, or "white squirrels", were early focuses of such history and have been noted on college campuses. The University of Texas at Austin's (UT) white squirrel population helped popularize albino squirrels as good luck charms; such folklore includes the animal being seen as a sign a student will ace an exam if spotted prior. However, the supposed albino squirrels at the Austin campus are actually leucistic fox squirrels. In 2001, UT students founded the Albino Squirrel Preservation Society, which has since acquired several further chapters. A University of North Texas student referendum was held to name Baby, a white squirrel on campus, as a secondary mascot. The student body narrowly voted against such an action. In 2019, Oberlin College adopted "Yeobie the Squirrel", a representation of an albino squirrel, as its mascot. Michigan Technological University in Houghton, Michigan, is home to frequently-sighted white squirrels that live on and around the campus.

Beloit College estimates it has around 200,000 squirrels on campus and was noted to feature its squirrel population in an admissions video in 2010. In 2011, The Gainesville Sun published a story covering local University of Florida (UF) students as commonly interacting with campus squirrels. Some UF students suggested that the proximity the squirrel populations had shared with humans began to cause the squirrels to lose their fear of humans. One Penn State student was nicknamed the "Squirrel Whisperer" after making hats for the squirrels on her campus. National media outlets The Huffington Post and USA Today covered the phenomenon in 2013 and 2014, respectively. Also in 2013, one Yale University student noticed a sudden lack of squirrels on the Yale campus, speculating in an email to Gawker that university officials exterminated them over the summer. This prompted an official response from a Yale spokesperson, who stated that the university had "not tried to reduce or manage the squirrel population." With campus squirrel populations garnering attention, student-run Facebook groups and Twitter accounts about them were commonly created. At Kalamazoo College, students established a squirrel-watching club.

Rodger Sherman
(@rodger)
tweeted:

1. did you attend a college with squirrels on campus
2. did people assert that your school's squirrels were, in some way, different from most squirrels

December 18, 2018

A December 2018 tweet from the @rodger account discussing college campus squirrels went viral online, further popularizing the phenomenon and drawing responses from official university accounts. In the late 2010s and early 2020s, various student newspapers published stories about campus squirrel populations, with some calling the squirrels integral to their institution's campus culture. (Note: Among others, some outlets that published such stories included The Daily Cougar, The Vanderbilt Hustler, The Daily Illini, The State News, and The Battalion.) Some universities, such as Hendrix College and Saint Louis University, have included subpages dedicated to the role squirrels hold in their campus culture on their official websites.

== Behavior and research ==
Though albino populations are common in such college folklore, other squirrel populations have also been cited on college campuses. The eastern gray squirrel and eastern fox squirrel are among the most commonly sighted. The former is the foremost represented, with Sciurus carolinensis being present on 62% of college campuses. Michigan State University is also home to American red squirrel, southern flying squirrel, thirteen-lined ground squirrel, groundhog and eastern chipmunk populations.

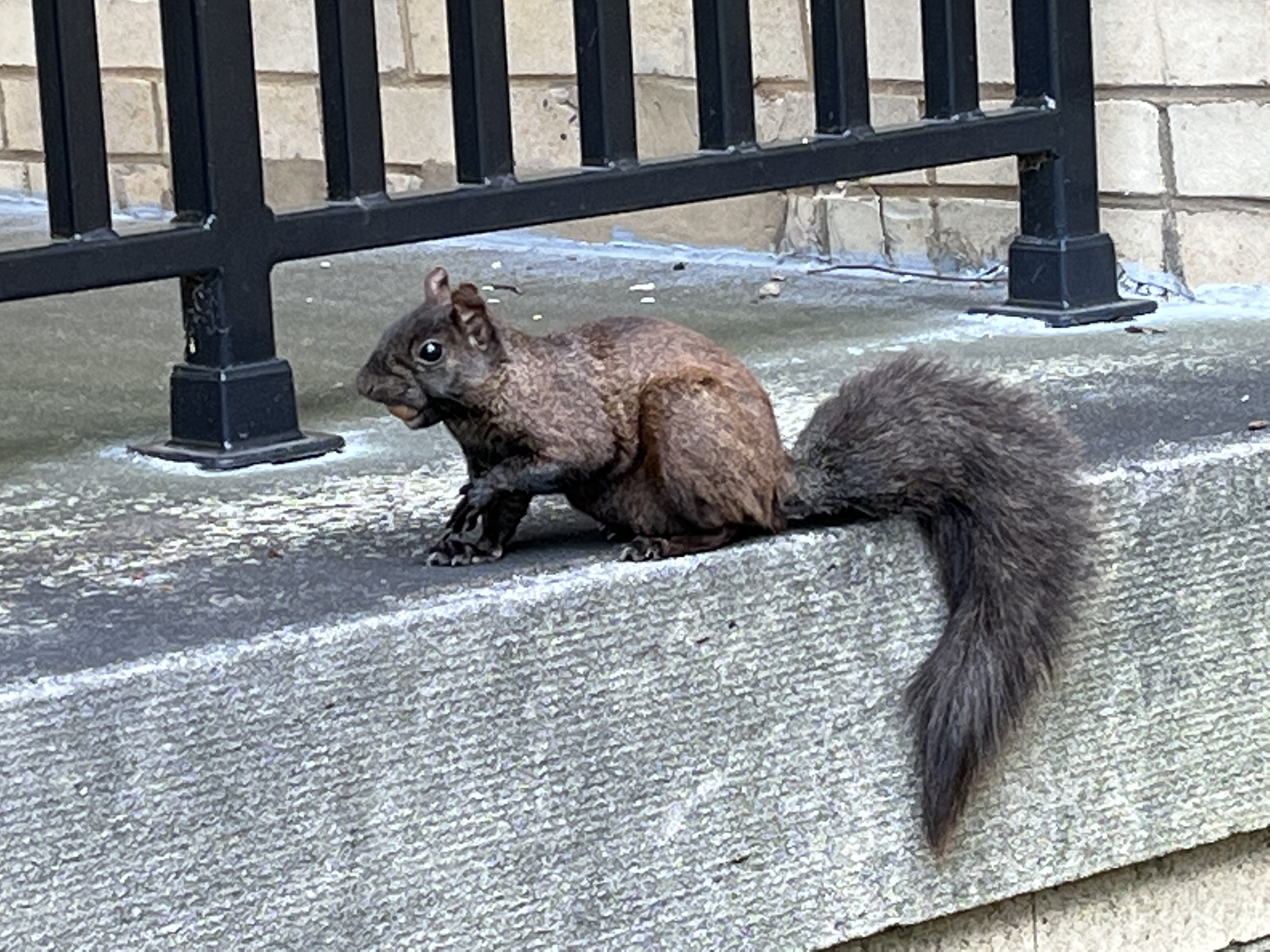
A brown melanistic eastern gray squirrel near Kent Hall at Kent State University

A 2002 study conducted at Texas A&M University researched how squirrels behave in urban settings, with the goal of being able to better manage such populations. The study saw each tree, building, sidewalk, and other structure tagged in a large Geographical Information System (GIS) database, ensuring that information about individual specimens can be easily accessed once a "squirrel is tracked to a particular tree." Researcher Roel Lopez suggested that the GIS information could be used by urban ecologists to manage abundant squirrel populations. Student research on respective campus squirrel populations has also been conducted at the Nebraska Wesleyan University and the University of New England's Biddeford Campus.

Later, in 2020, research by Joy Peplinski and Joel S. Brown collected reports from faculty experts at over 500 campuses in Canada and the continental U.S., in which squirrels were found to be "nearly ubiquitous". 95% of campuses were found to have at least one species, with 40% being inhabited by three or more.

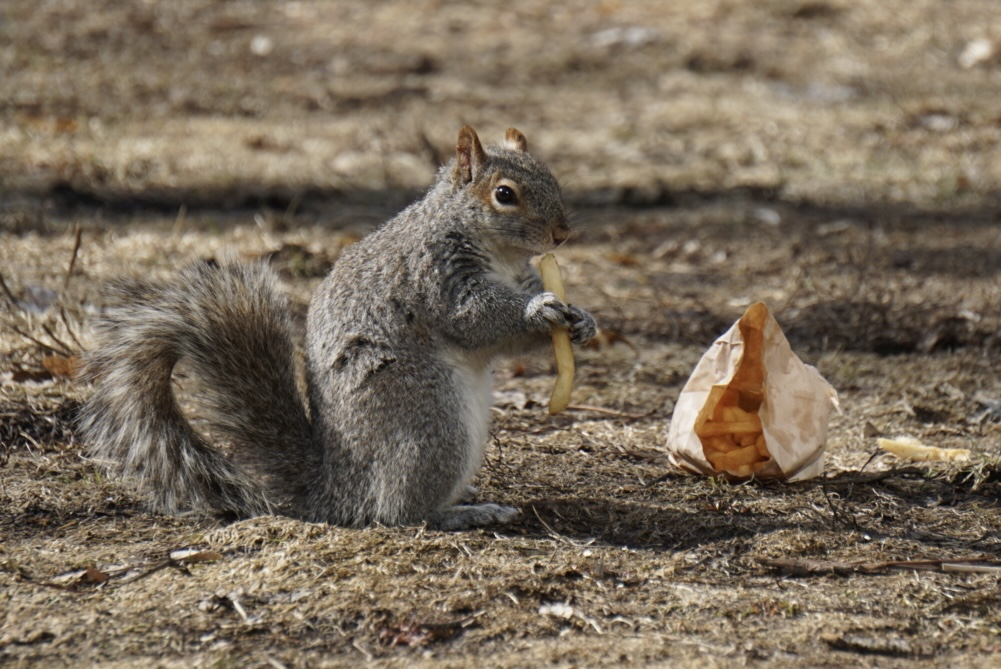
Squirrel eating a french fry on the campus of McGill University

As squirrels and humans share college campus space over time, the squirrel populations lose their fear and become more aggressive. Some students have been noted to feed squirrels, while others explicitly refrain from doing so. This tendency in combination with their proximity to students has led squirrels to associate humans with food, with some being documented boldly stealing food. Student newspapers have documented squirrels eating trash, with research on the matter finding that gray squirrels indeed consume anthropogenic food waste found on college campuses.

== Outside of North America ==
In 2018, a microblog centered around campus squirrels was launched by a student from Yunnan University, located in Kunming. The blog attracted attention on Chinese social media. An invasive species in Europe, gray squirrels have also been noted on the Streatham Campus of the University of Exeter, in the United Kingdom. Squirrels are also common in the Oxford University Parks.

== List of schools with noted squirrel populations ==
- Note: A double dagger (‡) listed denotes the institution is located outside of North America
- Albion College
- Allegheny College
- Amherst College
- Beloit College
- Bowdoin College
- Bradley University
- Brevard College
- Carleton College
- College of Wooster
- Colorado College
- Colorado State University
- Columbia University
- Concordia College (Moorhead, Minnesota)
- Dawson College
- DePauw University
- Drake University
- Duke University
- Elon University
- Fordham University
- Franklin & Marshall College
- George Mason University
- Goshen College
- Harvard University
- Haverford College
- Hendrix College
- Hope College
- Indiana University Indianapolis
- Kalamazoo College
- Kansas State University
- Kent State University
- Knox College
- Lehigh University
- Luther College
- Macalester College
- Mary Baldwin University
- Miami University
- Michigan State University
- Michigan Technological University
- National Autonomous University of Mexico
- Nebraska Wesleyan University
- Northwestern University
- Novosibirsk State University‡
- Oberlin College
- Ohio University
- Oklahoma State University
- Olney Central College
- Pennsylvania State University
- Princeton University
- Rice University
- Sacramento City College
- Saint Louis University
- Simpson College
- Smith College
- South Dakota State University
- St. Olaf College
- Texas A&M University
- Texas Christian University
- Trinity College (Connecticut)
- University of British Columbia
- University of California, Berkeley
- University of Central Florida
- University of Chicago
- University of Delaware
- University of Exeter (Streatham)‡
- University of Florida
- University of Georgia
- University of Illinois Urbana-Champaign
- University of Indianapolis
- University of Maine
- University of Maryland, Baltimore County
- University of Maryland, College Park
- University of Michigan
- University of Minnesota
- University of Houston
- University of Nebraska–Lincoln
- University of New England
- University of North Texas
- University of North Carolina at Chapel Hill
- University of South Carolina
- University of Southern California
- University of Texas at Austin
- University of Washington
- University of Wisconsin–Oshkosh
- Vanderbilt University
- Vassar College
- Washington University in St. Louis
- Wheaton College
- Yale University
- Yunnan University‡

== See also ==
- Pinto Bean (squirrel)
- Squirrel fishing
