= Nina Leen =

Russia-born American photographer (1914–1995)

Nina Leen (born 1914, died January 1, 1995) was an American photographer born in the Russian Empire. She was a constant contributor to Life. She is remembered above all for her photographs of animals, many published in book form, as well as her portraits.

== Biography ==
Born in Russia (probably between 1909 and 1914 although she kept her age a secret), Leen studied painting in Berlin. Before she emigrated to the United States in 1939, she had also lived in Italy and Switzerland. Her first photographs to be published in Life in April 1940 were of tortoises at the Bronx Zoo, taken with her Rolleiflex camera. While she never became a staff photographer at Life, she contributed as a contract photographer until the magazine closed in 1972. Leen was a prolific photographer of fashion for Life, and was long married to the fashion photographer Serge Balkin. She was recognised with inclusion by Edward Steichen of two of her photographs in The Family of Man international touring exhibition; one a photograph of a child at a blackboard, the other, several generations of an Ozark farming family (later selected by Carl Sagan for the 12 inch Voyager golden records).

Over the years, Leen was behind over 50 magazine covers and contributed countless reports from around the world, including the story of her dog Lucky which began in 1949 and later led to a book. In addition to her many animal stories, she is remembered for covering young people in the 1940s and 1950s and the group of artists known as The Irascibles. She also documented European royalty, fashion models, dance, and actresses. From 1973, Leen avidly continued to publish her work in book form, including her notable images of bats which she called her flying kittens.

== Publications ==
- Leen, Nina; Mackland, Ray (1951). Lucky, the Famous Foundling: Photogr. by Nina Leen, Text by Ray Mackland. Wyn.
- Leen, Nina; Novick, Alvin (1969). The World of Bats. Holt, Rinehart and Winston.
- Leen, Nina (1970). Women, Heroes, and a Frog. Rolf Harris. ISBN 978-0-393-08624-9.
- Leen, Nina; Davis, Joseph Anthony (1973). And then there were none: America's vanishing wildlife. Holt, Rinehart and Winston. ISBN 978-0-03-007466-0.
- Leen, Nina (1974). Dogs of All Sizes. Amphoto. ISBN 978-0-8174-0567-0.
- Leen, Nina (1974). Love, Sunrise, and Elevated Apes. Norton. ISBN 978-0-393-08699-7.
- Leen, Nina (1977). Images of Sound. W. W. Norton. ISBN 978-0-393-08800-7.
- Leen, Nina (1978). Monkeys. Henry Holt. ISBN 978-0-03-044001-4.
- Leen, Nina (1978). Snakes. Holt, Rinehart and Winston. ISBN 978-0-03-039926-8.
- Leen, Nina (1980). Taking pictures. Avon. ISBN 978-0-380-49205-3.
- Leen, Nina (1980). Cats. Holt, Rinehart, and Winston. ISBN 978-0-03-052331-1.
- Leen, Nina (1981). Rare and Unusual Animals. Henry Holt. ISBN 978-0-03-057478-8.

== See also ==
- Tommy Tucker (squirrel)
