= Efflorescence =

Migration of a salt to the surface of a porous material

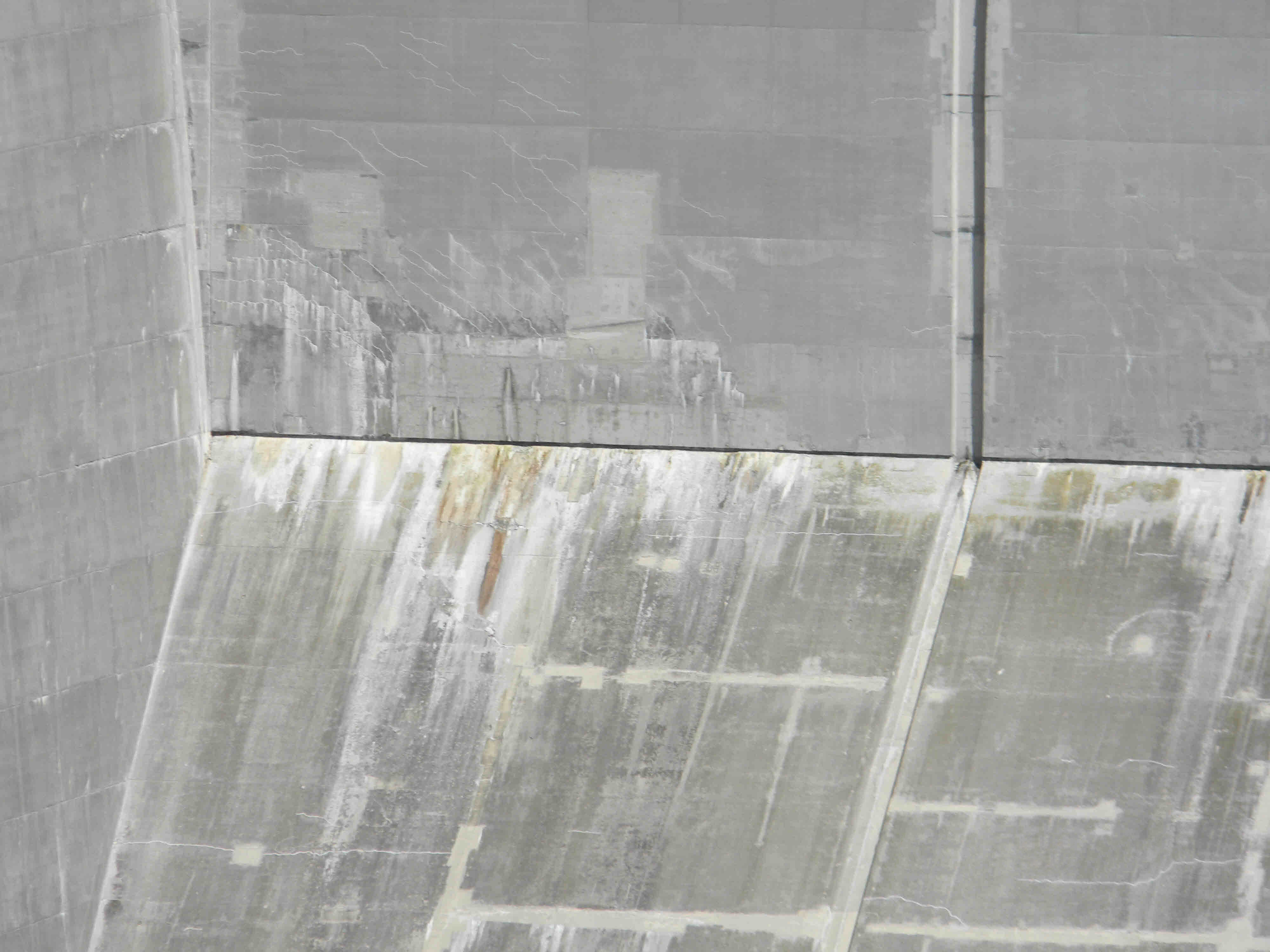
Secondary efflorescence on the dam of the Robert Moses Niagara Power Plant.

In chemistry, efflorescence (from the Latin efflorescere, 'to flower') is the migration of a salt to the surface of a porous material, where it forms a coating. The essential process involves the dissolving of an internally held salt in water or occasionally, in another solvent. The water, with the salt now held in solution, migrates to the surface, then evaporates, leaving a coating of the salt.

In primary efflorescence, the water is the invader and the salt was already present internally; secondary efflorescence is the reverse process, where the salt is originally present externally and is then carried inside in solution.

Efflorescence can occur in natural and built environments. On porous construction materials it may present a cosmetic outer problem only (primary efflorescence causing staining), but can sometimes indicate internal structural weakness (migration/degradation of component materials). Efflorescence may clog the pores of porous materials, resulting in the destruction of those materials by internal water pressure, as seen in the spalling of brick.

== Examples ==
1. A 5 molar concentration aqueous droplet of NaCl will spontaneously crystallize at 45% relative humidity (298 K) to form an NaCl cube by the mechanism of homogeneous nucleation. The original water is released to the gas phase.
2. Gypsum (CaSO_{4}.2H_{2}O) is a hydrate solid that, in a sufficiently dry environment, will give up its water to the gas phase and form anhydrite (CaSO_{4}).
3. Copper(II) sulfate (bluestone) (CuSO_{4}.5H_{2}O) is a blue crystalline solid that when exposed to air, slowly loses water of crystallization from its surface to form a white layer of anhydrous copper(II) sulfate.
4. Sodium carbonate decahydrate (Na_{2}CO_{3}.10H_{2}O) will lose water when exposed to air.

== Masonry ==
=== Primary efflorescence ===
Primary efflorescence is named such, as it typically occurs during the initial cure of a cementitious product. It often occurs on masonry construction, particularly brick, as well as some firestop mortars, when water moving through a wall or other structure, or water being driven out as a result of the heat of hydration as cement stone is being formed, brings salts to the surface that are not commonly bound as part of the cement stone. As the water evaporates, it leaves the salt behind, which forms a white, fluffy deposit, that can normally be brushed off. The resulting white deposits are referred to as "efflorescence" in this instance. In this context efflorescence is sometimes referred to as "saltpetering." Since primary efflorescence brings out salts that are not ordinarily part of the cement stone, it is not a structural, but, rather, an aesthetic concern.

For controlling primary efflorescence, formulations containing liquid fatty acid mixtures (e.g., oleic acid and linoleic acid) have commonly been used. The oily liquid admixture is introduced into the batch mix at an early stage by coating onto the sand particles prior to the introduction of any mix water, so that the oily admixture is distributed uniformly throughout the concrete batch mix.

=== Secondary efflorescence ===
Secondary efflorescence is named such as it does not occur as a result of the forming of the cement stone or its accompanying hydration products. Rather, it is usually due to the external influence of concrete poisons, such as chlorides. A very common example of where secondary efflorescence occurs is steel-reinforced concrete bridges as well as parking garages. Saline solutions are formed due to the presence of road salt in the winter. This saline solution is absorbed into the concrete, where it can begin to dissolve cement stone, which is of primary structural importance. Virtual stalactites can be formed in some cases as a result of dissolved cement stone, hanging off cracks in concrete structures. Where this process has taken hold, the structural integrity of a concrete element is at risk. This is a common traffic infrastructure and building maintenance concern. Secondary efflorescence is akin to osteoporosis of the concrete.

For controlling secondary efflorescence, admixtures containing aqueous-based calcium stearate dispersion (CSD) are often added at a later stage of the batching process with the mix water. In a typical batching process, sand is first charged into the mixer, then the oil-based primary anti-efflorescence admixture is added with constant mixing to allow the oil to coat the sand. Then coarse aggregates, colorants, and cement are added, followed by water. If CSD is used, it is then introduced usually at this point during or after the addition of the mix water. CSD is an aqueous dispersion wherein fine solid particles of calcium stearate are suspended in the water uniformly. Commercially available CSD has an average particle size of about 1 to 10 micrometres. The uniform distribution of CSD in the mix may render the resulting concrete masonry unit water repellent, as CSD particles are well distributed in the pores of the unit to interfere with the capillary movement of water.

Calthemite is also a secondary deposit derived from concrete, mortar or lime, which can be mistakenly assumed to be efflorescence. Calthemites are usually deposited as calcite which is the most stable polymorph of calcium carbonate (CaCO_{3}).

=== Protecting against efflorescence ===
It is possible to protect porous building materials such as brick, tiles, and concrete against efflorescence by treating the material with an impregnating, hydro-phobic sealer. This is a sealer that repels water and will penetrate deeply enough into the material to keep water and dissolved salts well away from the surface. However, in climates where freezing is a concern, such a sealer may lead to damage from freeze/thaw cycles. And while it will help to protect against efflorescence, it cannot permanently prevent the problem.

Common rebar protective measures include the use of epoxy coating.

Certain cement types are less resistant to chlorides than others. The choice of cement, therefore, can have a large effect upon the concrete's reaction to chlorides.

Today's water repellents help create a vapor permeable barrier; liquid water, especially from wind driven rains, will stay out of the brick and masonry. Water vapor from the interior of the building, or from the underside of pavers can escape. This will reduce efflorescence, spalling and scaling that can occur from water being trapped inside the brick substrate and freezing during cold weather. Years ago, the water repellents trapped moisture in the masonry wall creating more problems than they solved. Condensation in areas that experienced the four seasons were much more problematic than their counterparts.

=== Image gallery ===
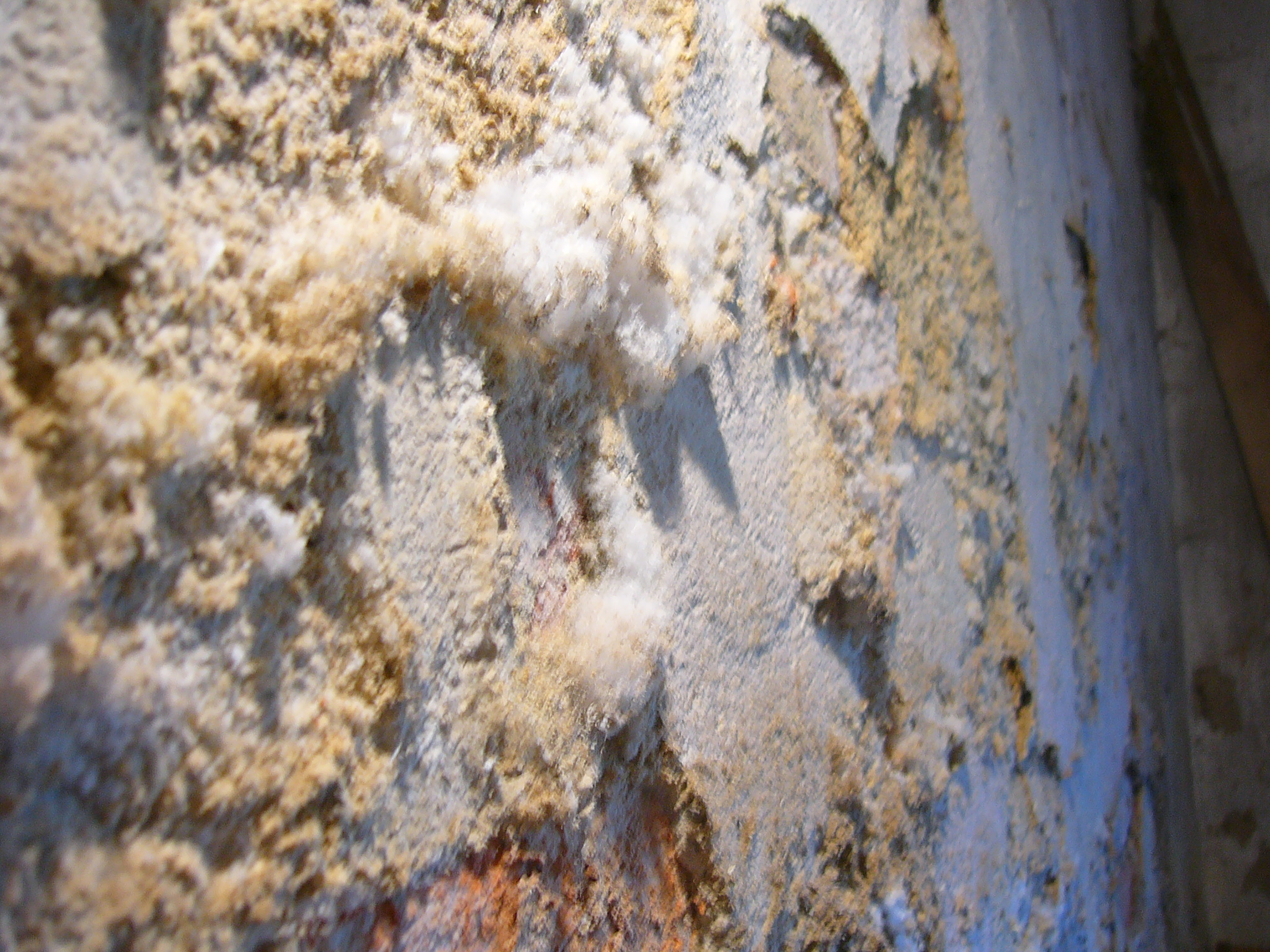
Primary efflorescence on a brick wall in Germany.

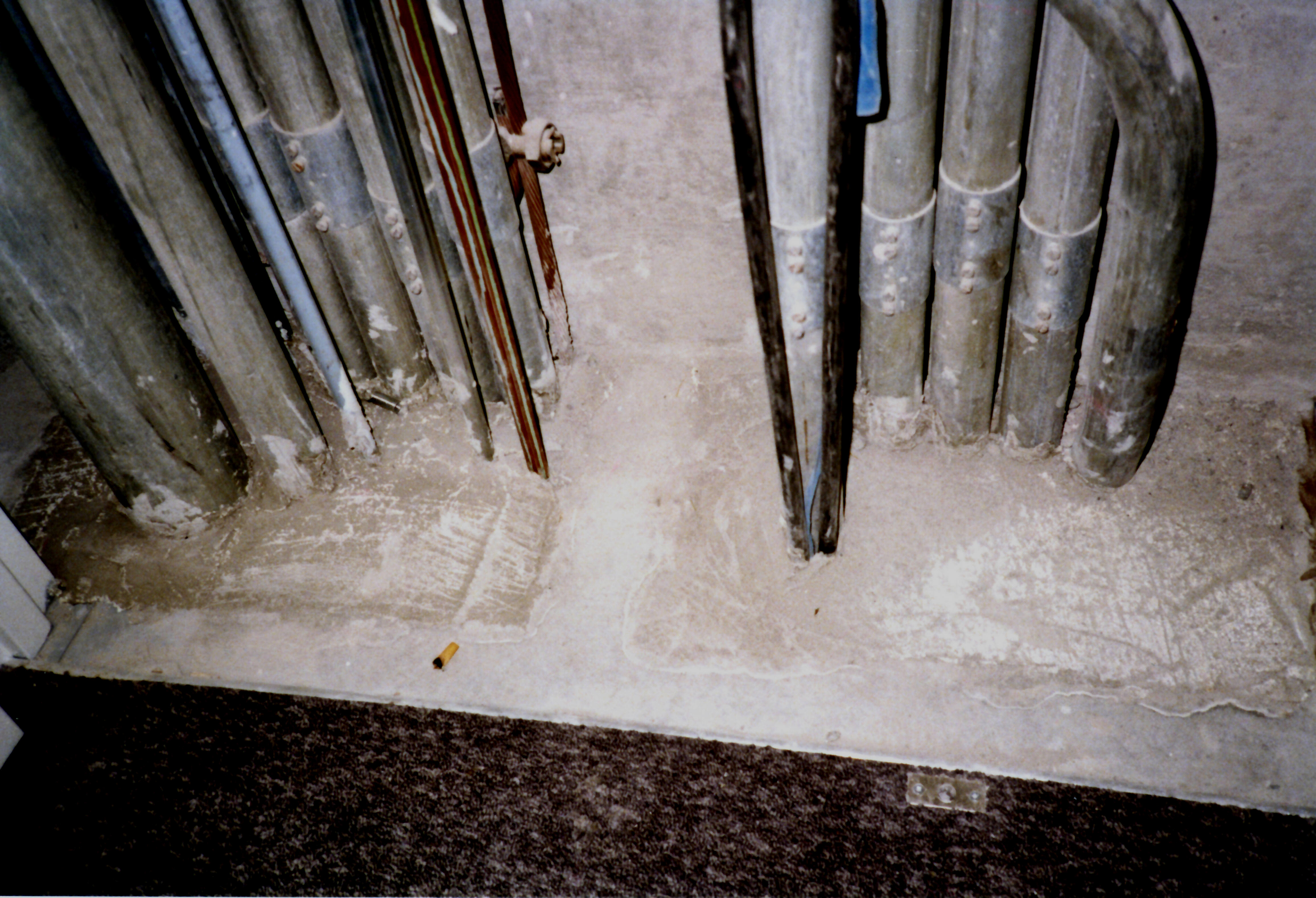
Primary efflorescence on a firestop mortar at Mississauga Civic Centre in Mississauga, Ontario City Hall.

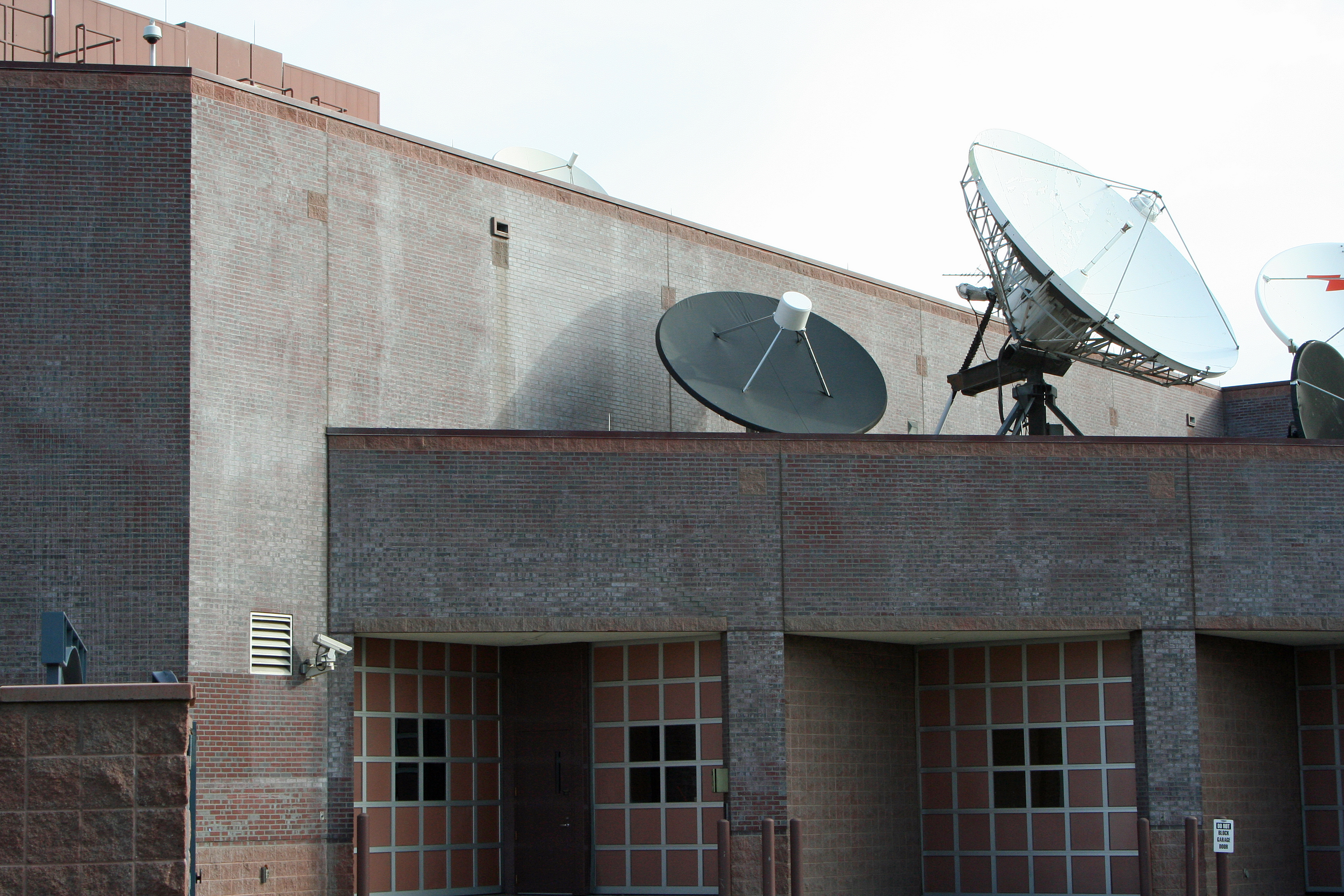
Substantial primary efflorescence on a building in Denver, Colorado.
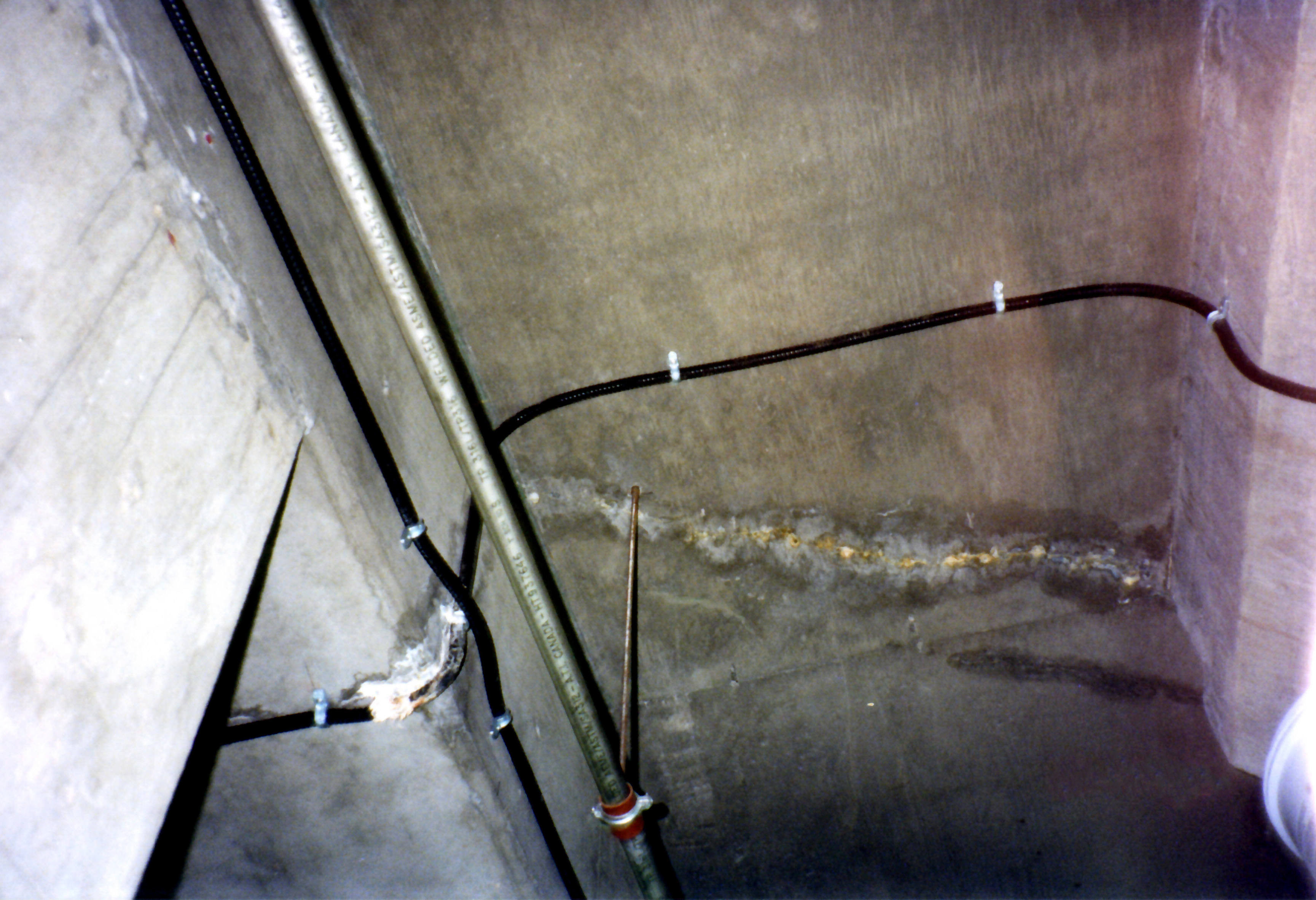
Secondary efflorescence - dissolving the cement stone and attacking rebar

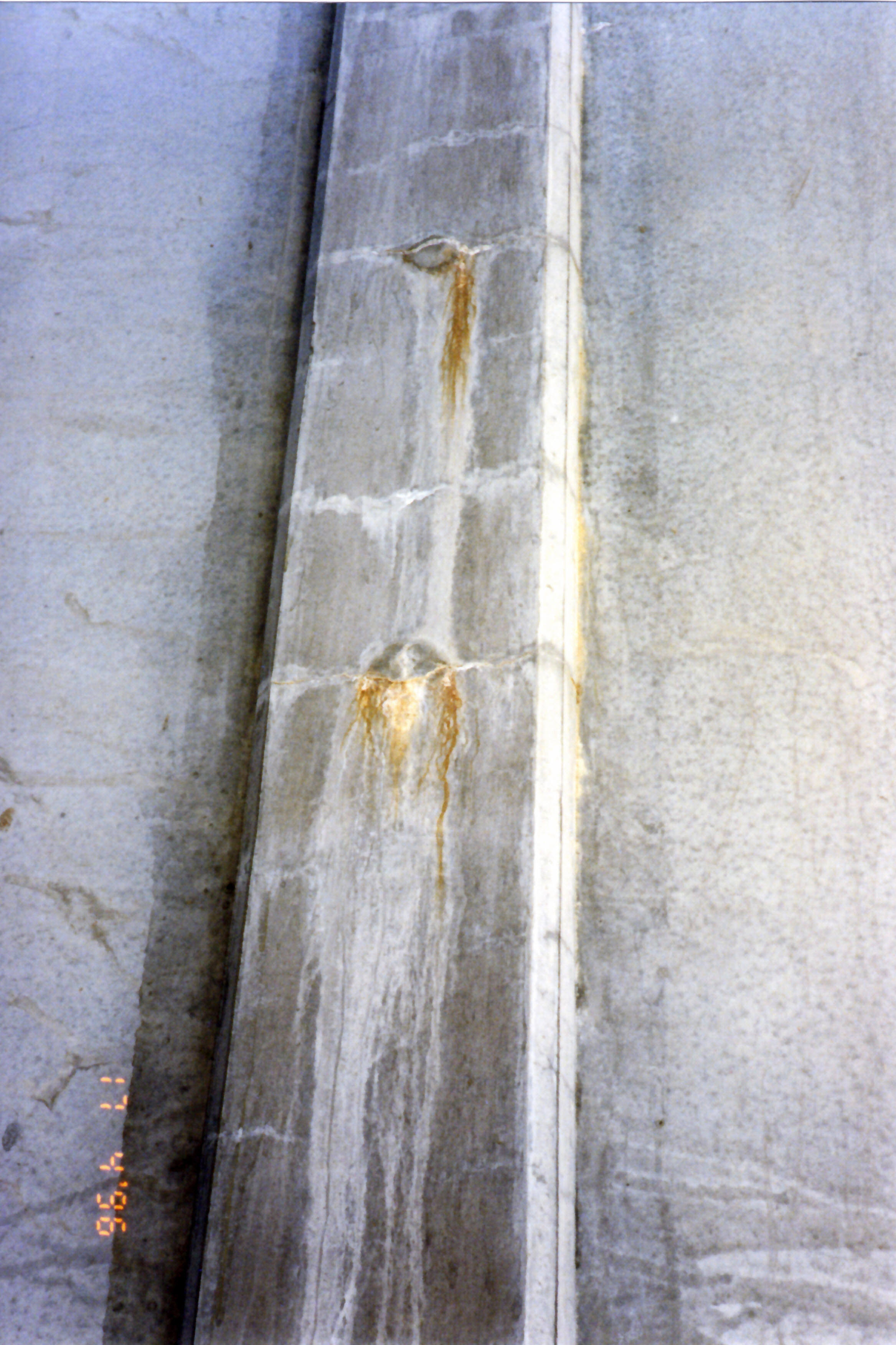
Secondary efflorescence

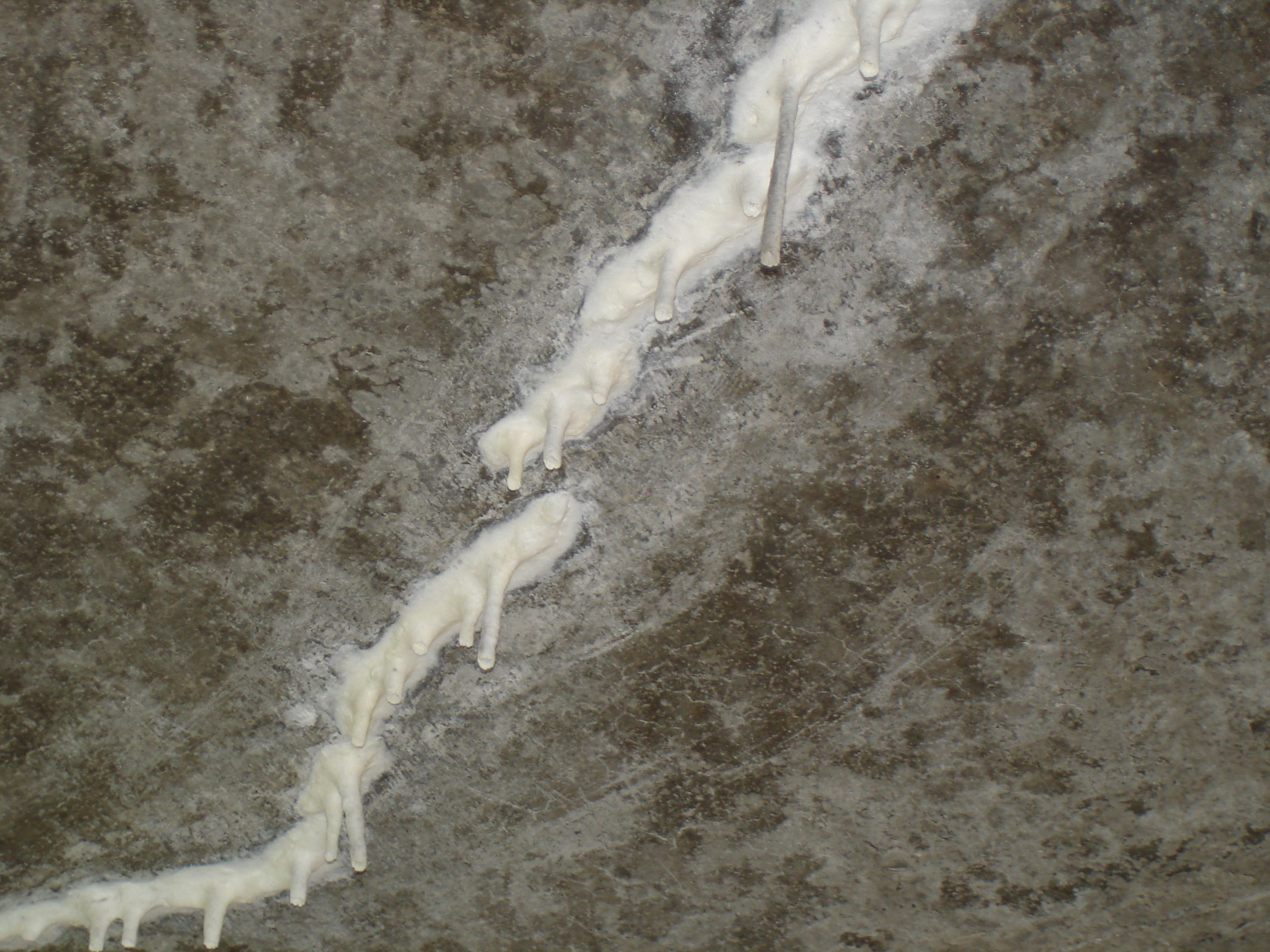
Concrete derived secondary deposit of calcium carbonate creating calthemite stalactites, which can be mistakenly confused with efflorescence.

== See also ==
- Calthemite
- Hydrate
- Hygroscopy
- Our Lady of the Underpass
- Bloom (phase), similar phenomena seen in polymers
