= Conrad (raccoon) =

Raccoon found dead in Toronto

Conrad the Raccoon
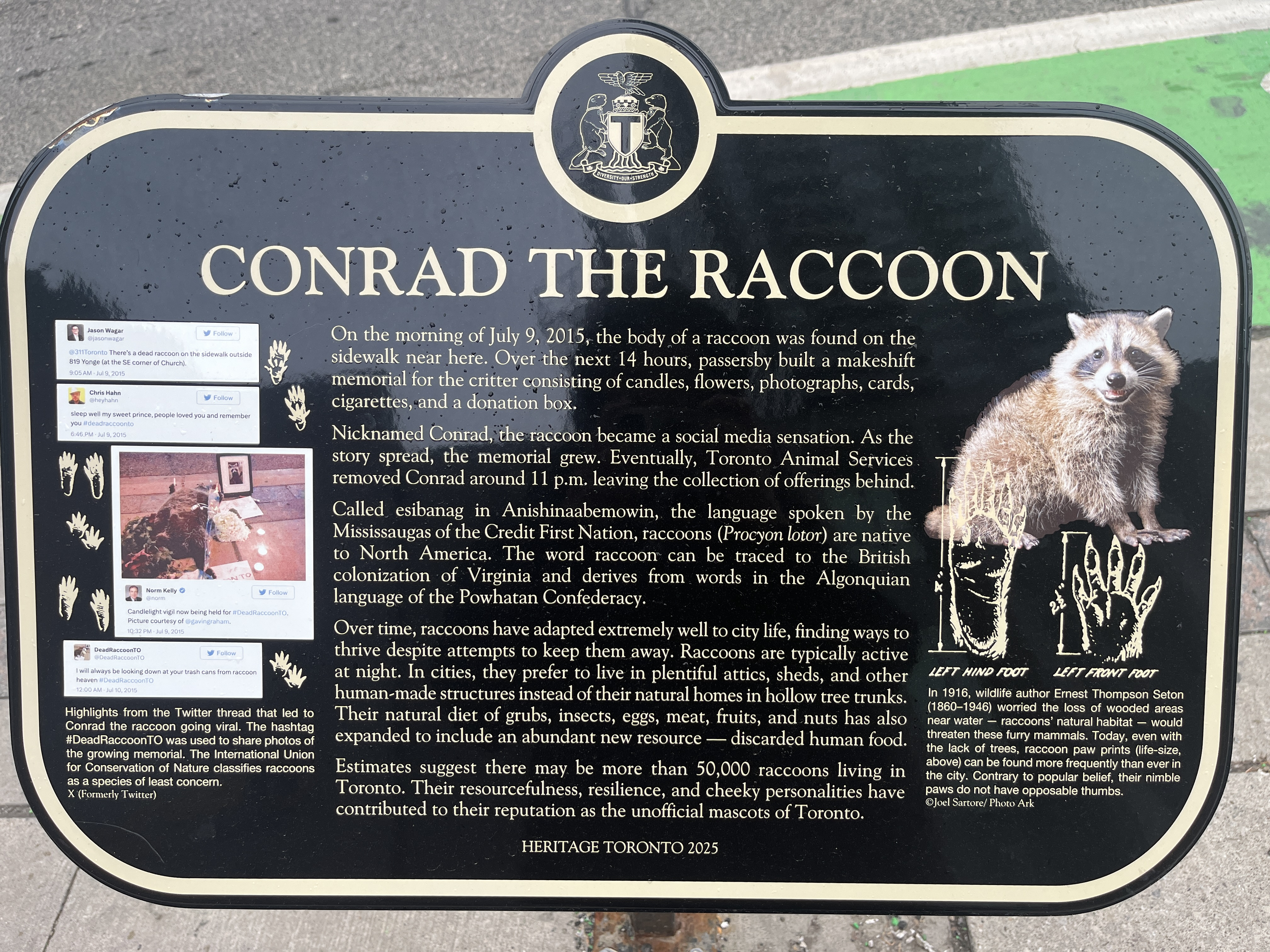
- The Heritage Toronto plaque commemorating Conrad
- Interactive map of Conrad the Raccoon
- Location: Near 819 Yonge Street, Toronto, Ontario, Canada
- Coordinates: 43°40′21.4″N 79°23′15.5″W

Conrad was a raccoon that died on the corner of Yonge and Church streets in the Yorkville area of Toronto in 2015. Conrad's remains received widespread attention on social media and in-person tributes before being removed by the City of Toronto's animal services unit.

== History ==
Conrad gained attention on the morning of July 9, 2015, where the raccoon's carcass was discovered on the sidewalk of 819 Yonge Street. Five hours after they first noticed it, workers at a technology company placed a condolence card and a rose at the location. A framed photo of a raccoon was added to the makeshift memorial later in the day.

Multiple social media posts, including tweets from then–Toronto city councillor Norm Kelly, were made on Twitter with the intention to alert Toronto's animal services after multiple unsuccessful phone reports. According to freelance writer Kris Pangilinan, Kelly named the raccoon Conrad via a tweet that was later deleted.

After hours without the body's removal, the remains of Conrad continued to be posted on social media under the hashtag #DeadRaccoonTO. Many Toronto residents visited the body with flowers, cards, candles, cigarettes, and a donation box, creating an impromptu shrine. Fourteen hours after the initial discovery, the carcass was eventually removed by animal services after significant pressure on social media.

== Legacy ==
A recreation of Conrad and the makeshift shrine was sculpted out of butter at the butter sculpture showcase during the Canadian National Exhibition in 2015 by Ukrainian sculptor Olenka Kleban.

In 2023 a design for CONRAD, a sculpture made out of wood by Novak Djogo & Daniel Joshua Vanderhorst honoring the raccoon was one of eight winning designs for the annual Winter Stations design competition. The design was built as a public sculpture and exhibited at Woodbine Beach. The sculpture was also publicly installed for the Winter Stations 2024 exhibition.

On the ninth anniversary of Conrad's death, a memorial with a eulogy for the raccoon was held at the Museum of Toronto. An official commemorative heritage plaque was erected on the sidewalk by the Heritage Toronto Plaques Program on the tenth anniversary of Conrad's death.

== See also ==
- Chicago rat hole
- Jimothy
