= Pinto Bean (squirrel) =

American piebald squirrel (died 2022)

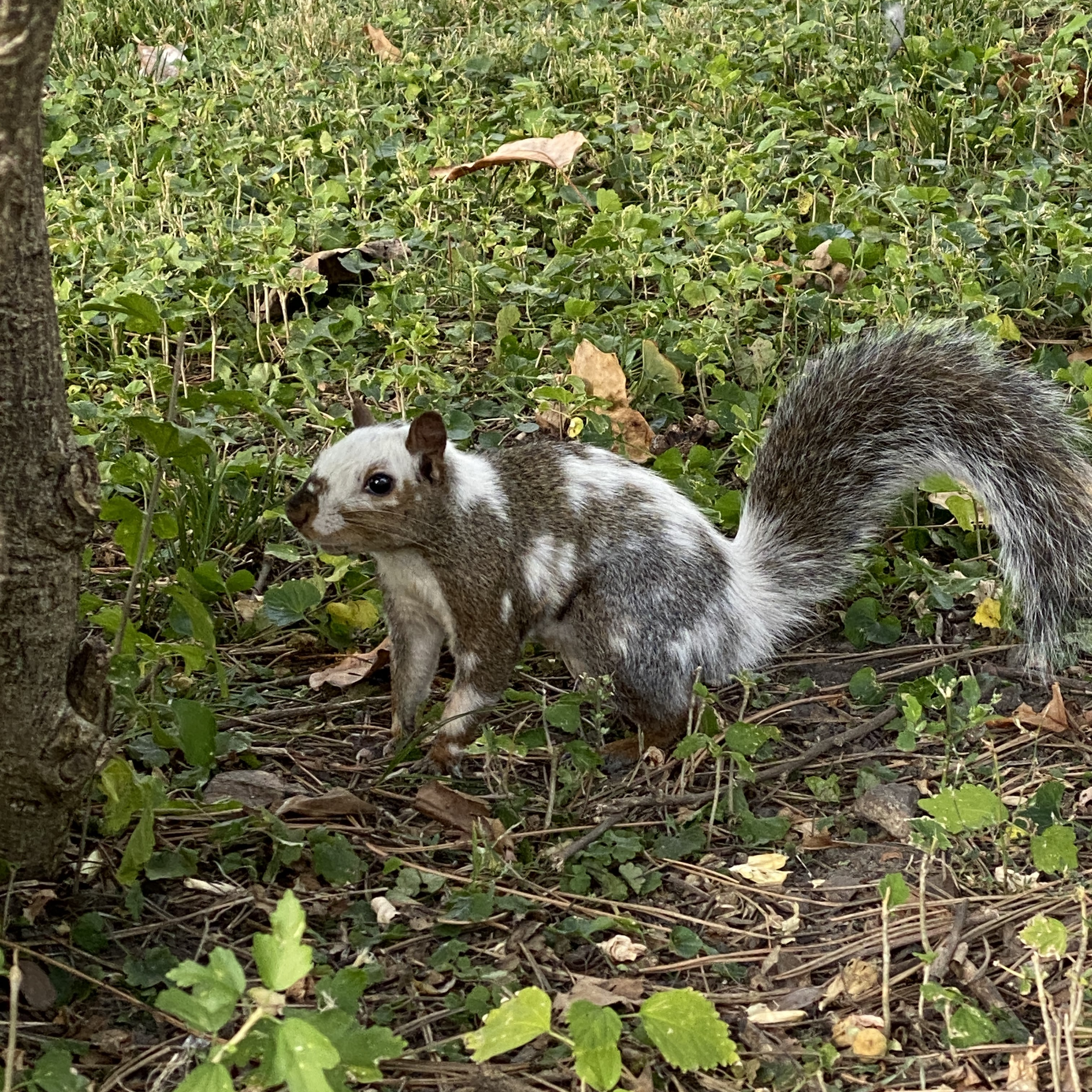
- Pinto Bean in Champaign, October 2022
- Species: Eastern gray squirrel
- Sex: Male
- Died: October 8, 2022; Springfield Avenue, Champaign, Illinois, U.S.
- Cause of death: Motor vehicle collision
- Known for: Distinctive piebald pattern, media appearances and tributes
- Residence: University of Illinois Urbana-Champaign

Pinto Bean was an eastern gray squirrel on the campus of the University of Illinois Urbana-Champaign who was renowned and named for his rare piebald pattern. He died in Champaign on October 8, 2022, presumably due to a motor vehicle collision. Pinto Bean has been called a "minor celebrity" and a "grassroots, unofficial mascot" for the university. During a home football game against Minnesota, a tribute to Pinto Bean was shown on the jumbotron at Memorial Stadium.

== Pattern ==
A male eastern gray squirrel, Pinto Bean was named for his distinctive mixture of gray fur with patches of unpigmented white fur, which resembled the appearance of pinto beans. According to Illinois Natural History Survey director Eric Shauber, this was the result of a rare genetic mutation that affected where melanin was distributed in the squirrel's body. Shauber said the mutation was rare enough to assume that there was only one such squirrel on campus.

== Death and taxidermy ==
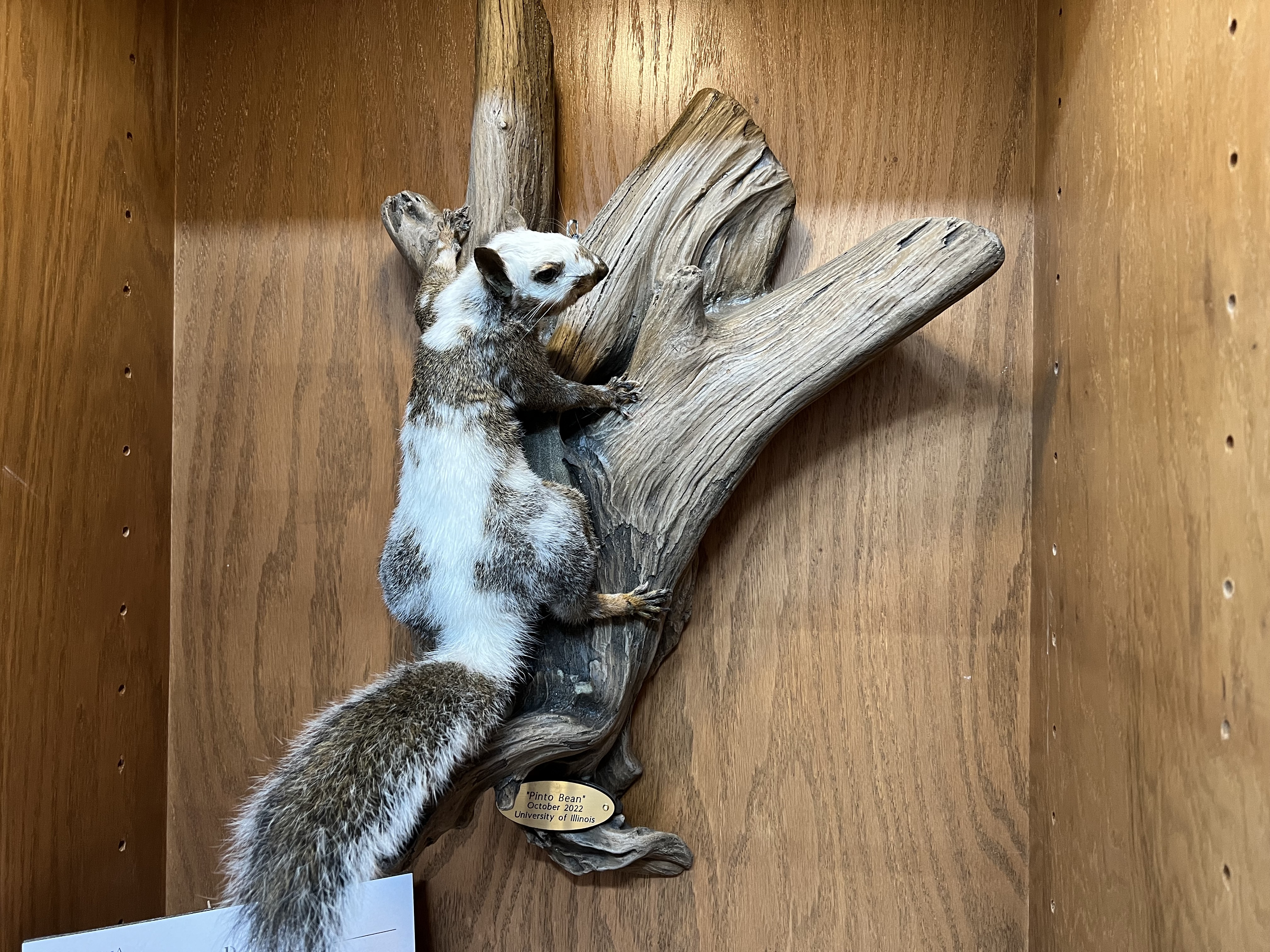
Taxidermy of Pinto Bean on display at the Forbes Natural History Building in Champaign, March 2023

Pinto Bean was found dead on the side of Springfield Avenue in Champaign on October 8, 2022. His cause of death was presumably a vehicular collision. News of his death quickly spread on the r/UIUC subreddit and other social media. One user, Champaign resident Clark Jackson, retrieved the squirrel's remains and delivered them to a taxidermist in Bloomington in an effort to preserve the squirrel.

As of March 27, 2023, Pinto Bean's taxidermied remains are on display at the Forbes Natural History Building on the south side of the university's campus.

== Tributes ==
During Illinois's October 15, 2022, home football game against Minnesota, the jumbotron at Memorial Stadium displayed a tribute to Pinto Bean at halftime. The screen displayed an image of Pinto Bean, accompanied by the message: "RIP to Pinto Bean the Squirrel, forever in our hearts."

The Illini Wildlife and Conservation Club held a moment of silence in remembrance of Pinto Bean. Students and community members shared many tributes and eulogies on r/UIUC.

== See also ==
- Chicago rat hole
- Tommy Tucker (squirrel)
- Squirrels on college campuses
