= Chicago rat hole =

Rat-shaped hole in a Chicago sidewalk

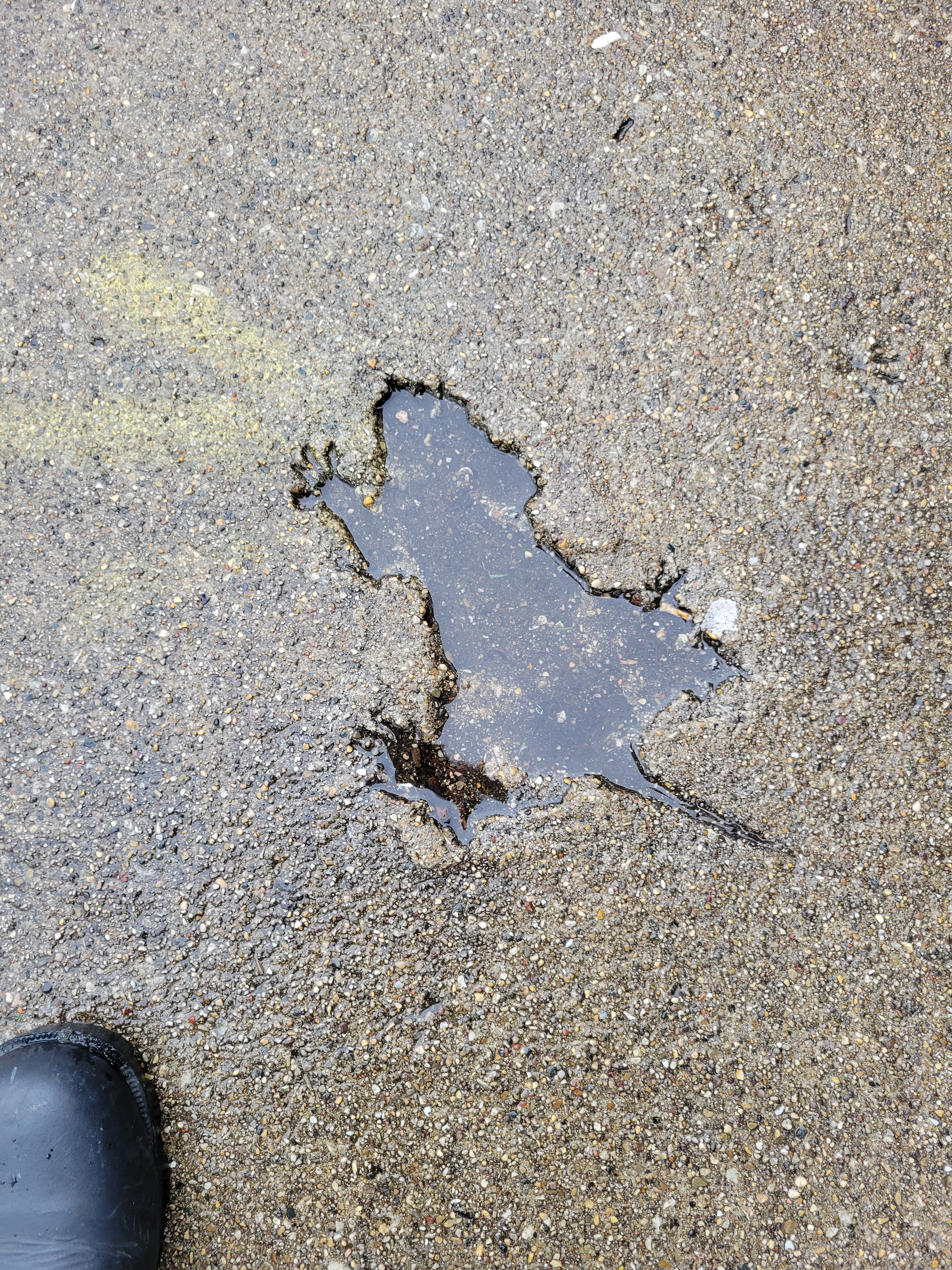
- The hole, as pictured in Dumaine's original tweet
- Interactive map of Chicago rat hole
- Location: Near 1918 West Roscoe Street, Chicago, Illinois, U.S.
- Coordinates: 41.943321°N 87.676881°W
- Type: Hole
- Removed: April 24, 2024

The Chicago rat hole is a hole shaped like a rat that was formerly in the sidewalk of West Roscoe Street in the Roscoe Village neighborhood of Chicago, Illinois, United States. After several decades, it received widespread attention on social media (mainly Twitter) in early 2024, attracting tourists to the site. In April 2024, city officials removed the sidewalk slab containing the hole. It is currently stored in City Hall.

An apparent example of accidental lifecasting, the hole was described by The New York Times as "Chicago's Stonehenge". Some neighbors and wildlife experts speculated that the impression was made by a squirrel rather than a rat; a 2025 research paper in Biology Letters found this to be the most likely case, based on comparison of the cast with anatomical data from squirrel populations.

== History ==
Gatorade Should Be Thicker.
(@WinslowDumaine)
tweeted:

Had to make a pilgrimage to the Chicago Rat Hole

January 6, 2024

The hole gained worldwide attention on January 6, 2024, via a tweet by Chicago-based comedian and writer Winslow Dumaine. In what has been described as a "pilgrimage", many Chicago residents visited the hole and made offerings to it, such as coins, flowers, candles, cheese, cigarettes, alcohol, children's toys, food, and estradiol pills. One group of visitors took shots of Chicago specialty Malört beside the hole before leaving the bottle as an oblation. The Riot Fest Historical Society also dedicated a plaque at the site of the hole.

Despite its newfound attention in 2024, the hole had existed for at least 20 to 30 years, according to locals. A local softball team has been using the rat as its unofficial mascot since around 2018.

The hole's notoriety reached political and business channels. Ann Williams, the state representative for Illinois's 11th district, posted an online video promoting the hole, calling it "the jewel of the 11th district". The Chamber of Commerce for Lakeview and Roscoe Village ran a naming contest for the hole, with "Splatatouille" — a reference to the film Ratatouille — beating the other four finalists ("Lil' Stucky", "Splat", "Roscoe Road-dent" and "Dibs").

On January 19, 2024, the hole was filled in with plaster or cement by an unknown party. City officials later confirmed they had not filled in the hole. Ann Williams posted a video stating "we are shocked and saddened" by the news, and "are closely monitoring the developing situation". Local residents attempted to excavate the hole using their hands and instruments such as ice scrapers and license plates. Eventually, a woman cleaned out the hole and restored it to its original condition.

Following the restoration, Williams wrote "This is what community is all about." Shortly afterwards, an engagement and a marriage ceremony took place at the hole. Some residents of West Roscoe Street expressed frustration with the hole's newfound viral status, with some locals citing public nuisance, vandalism, and accumulation of garbage on the sidewalk.

=== Removal from West Roscoe Street ===
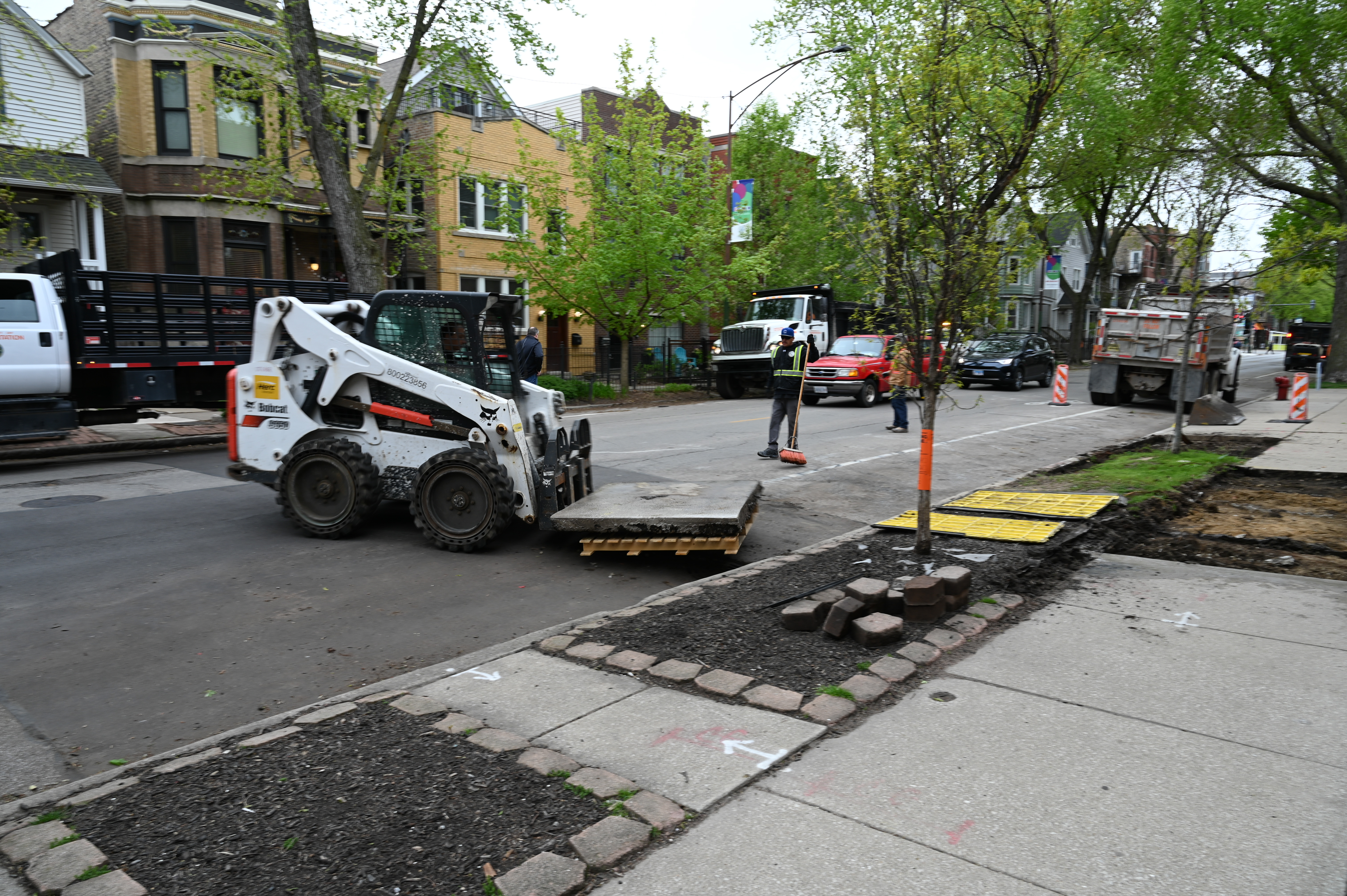
The slab containing the hole being removed on April 24, 2024

On April 24, 2024, the Chicago Department of Transportation removed the sidewalk slab containing the hole while keeping it intact. A "Rathole Music Fest" was held at a venue under three miles south of the site in June, featuring local bands as well as burlesque and poetry performances.

As of January 2025, the slab is stored in City Hall. Chicago Streets and Sanitation Commissioner Cole Stallard said that those at City Hall would "like to be able to showcase it so more people can enjoy it." Dumaine began selling plaster casts of the hole, with all proceeds going to Northside women's homeless shelter Sarah's Circle.

== Debate over origin ==
Despite the hole's popular name, some locals believe it was formed by a squirrel. The director of Lincoln Park Zoo's Urban Wildlife Institute, Seth Magle, told NBC Chicago that he believed it likely that a squirrel fell on the wet concrete from a tree. Magle also clarified that the thinness of the tail cavity, used by some to argue in favor of it being a rat hole, should not be considered, given that fur does not always leave impressions. Supporting this theory, one resident stated that an oak tree had existed above that section of the sidewalk that had since been cut down.

A 2025 paper published in Biology Letters by scientists from the University of Tennessee and New York Institute of Technology College of Osteopathic Medicine analyzed several species of mammals present in Chicago and concluded that the imprint was most likely to have been made by an Eastern gray squirrel.

== Similar phenomena ==
The rat hole has also brought attention to other object-shaped sidewalk holes, such as a gun-shaped hole in Richmond, Virginia, that was similarly enshrined by locals. For several days in September 2024, a purse filled with Lucky Charms was seen hanging from a sign for Addison Street in Chicago and received similar visits from Chicagoans.

== Gallery ==
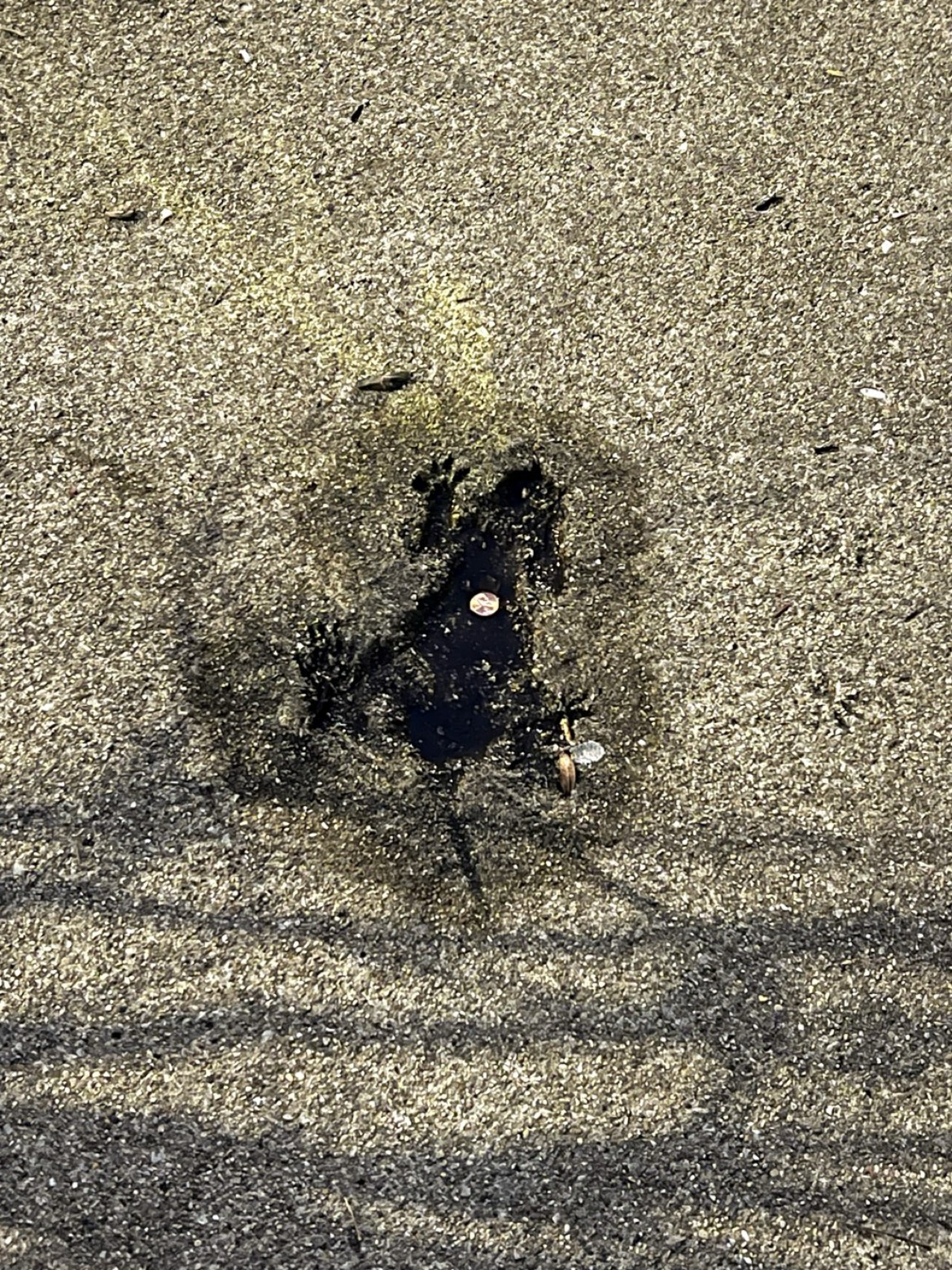
The hole on January 7, 2024, shortly after the photographer placed the first penny

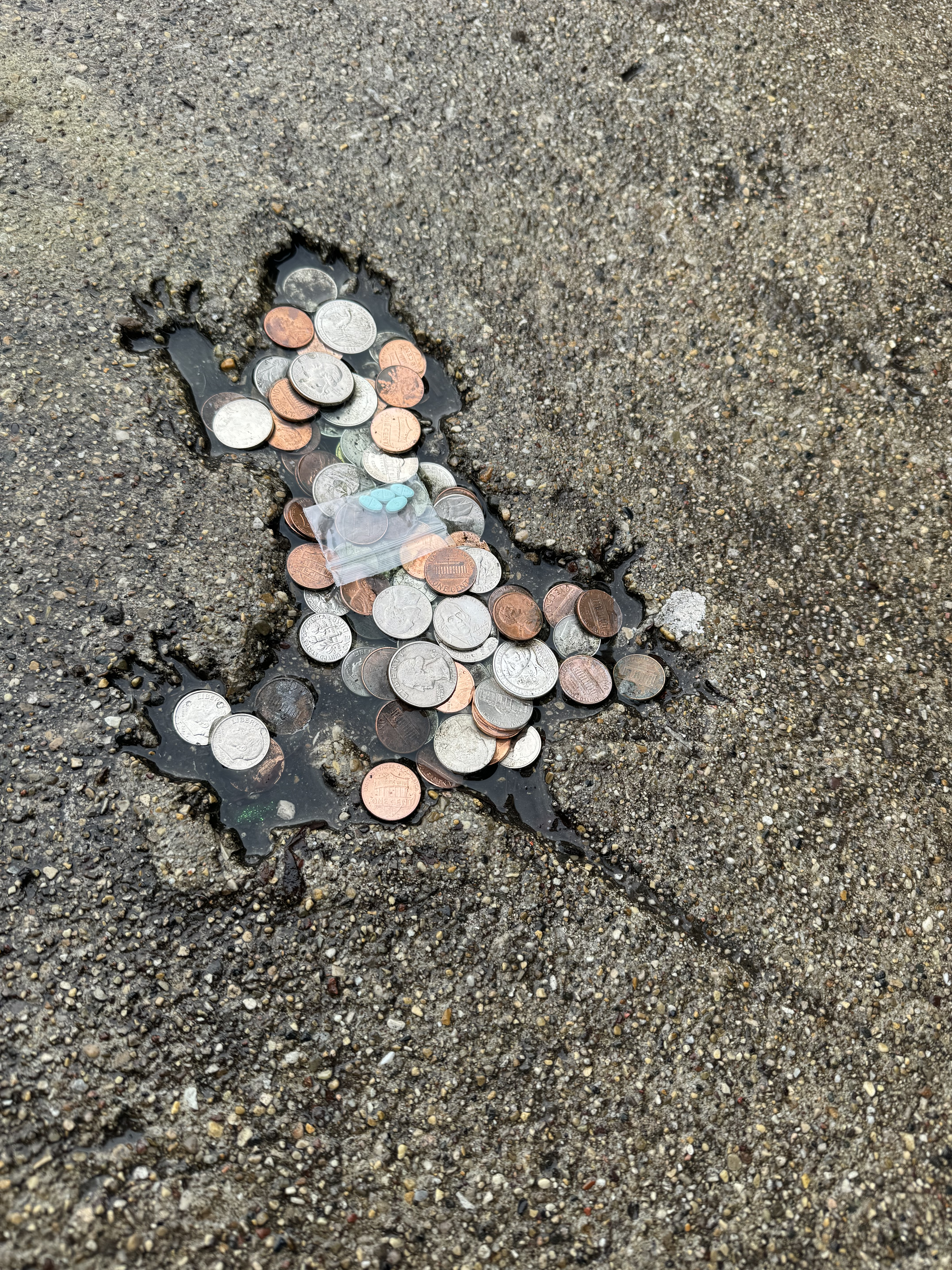
The hole on January 13, filled with coins and a bag of estradiol pills

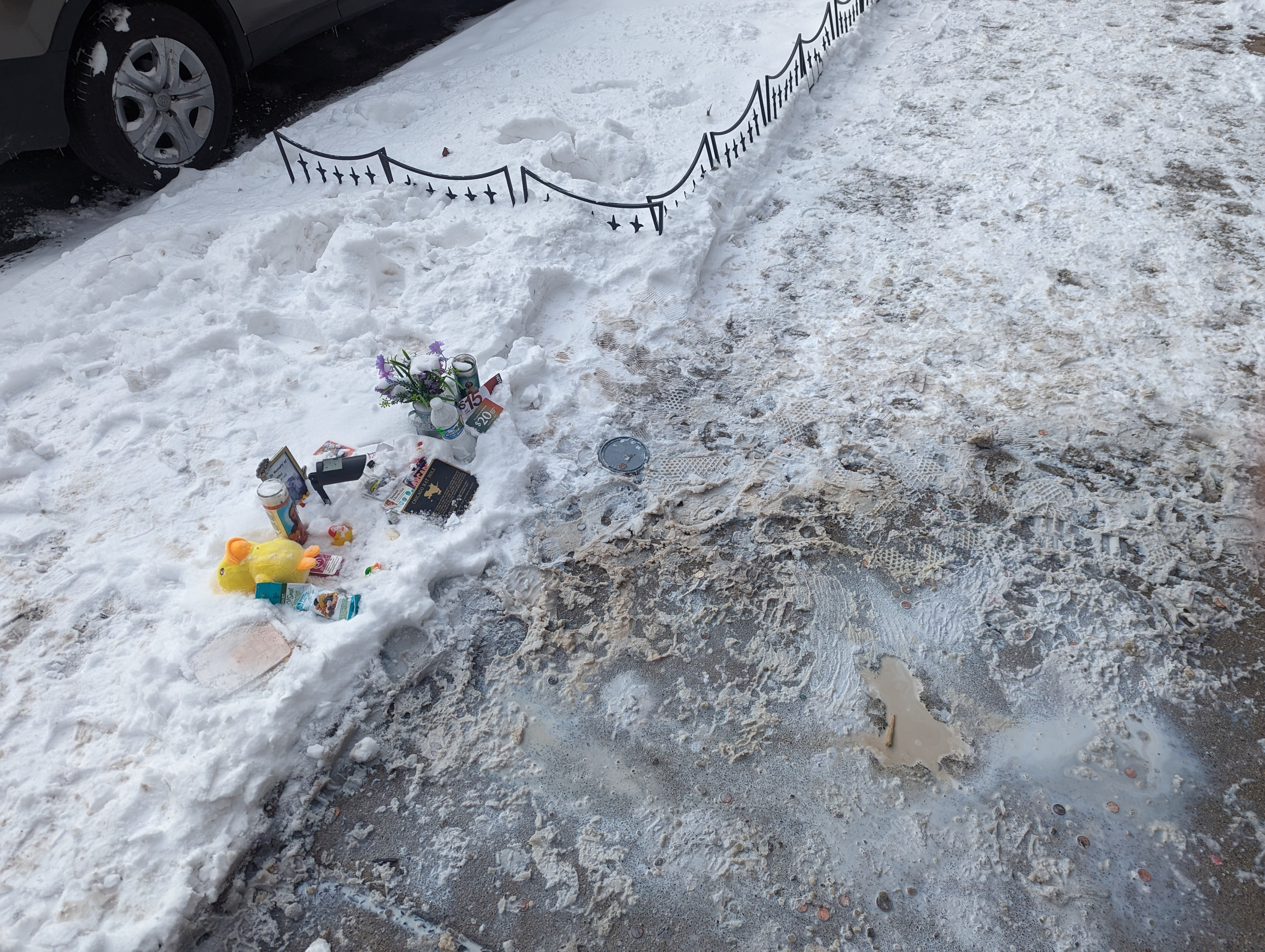
The hole on January 19, shortly after it had been filled in

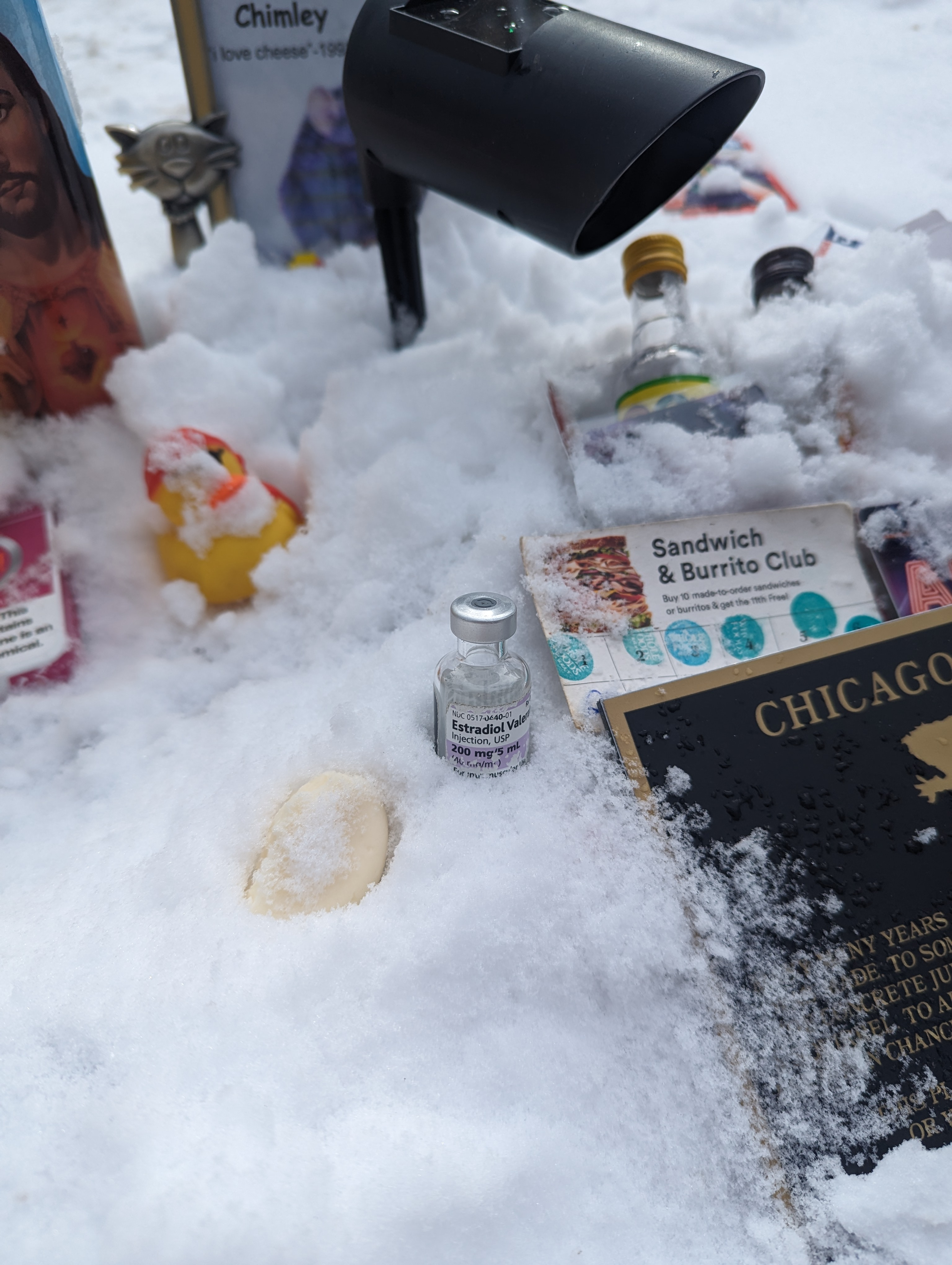
Following the online popularity of the estradiol pills gifted on January 13, a vial of injectable estradiol was placed on the shrine on January 19.

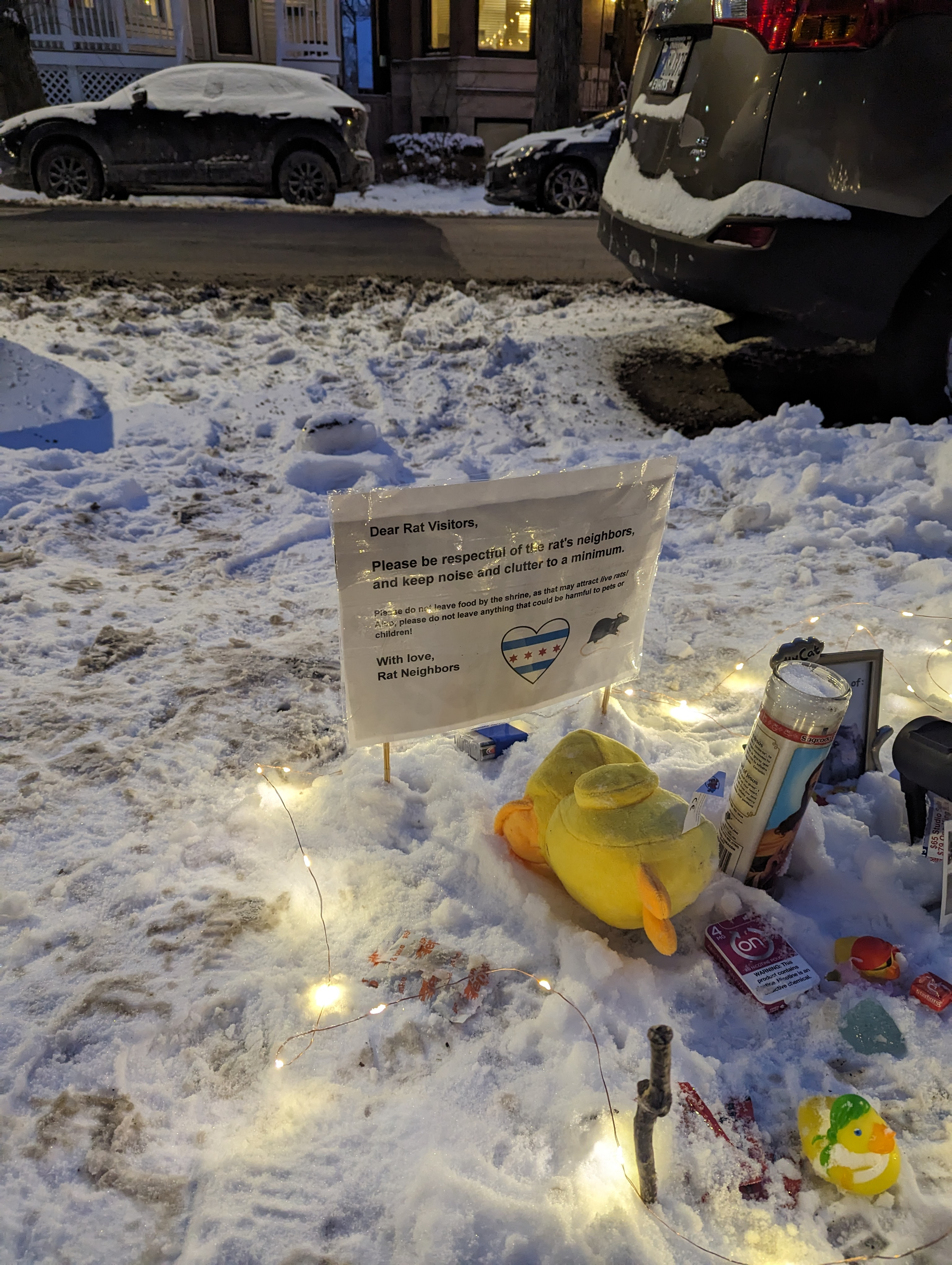
Signage put up by locals on January 19, asking visitors not to leave food and to keep noise to a minimum

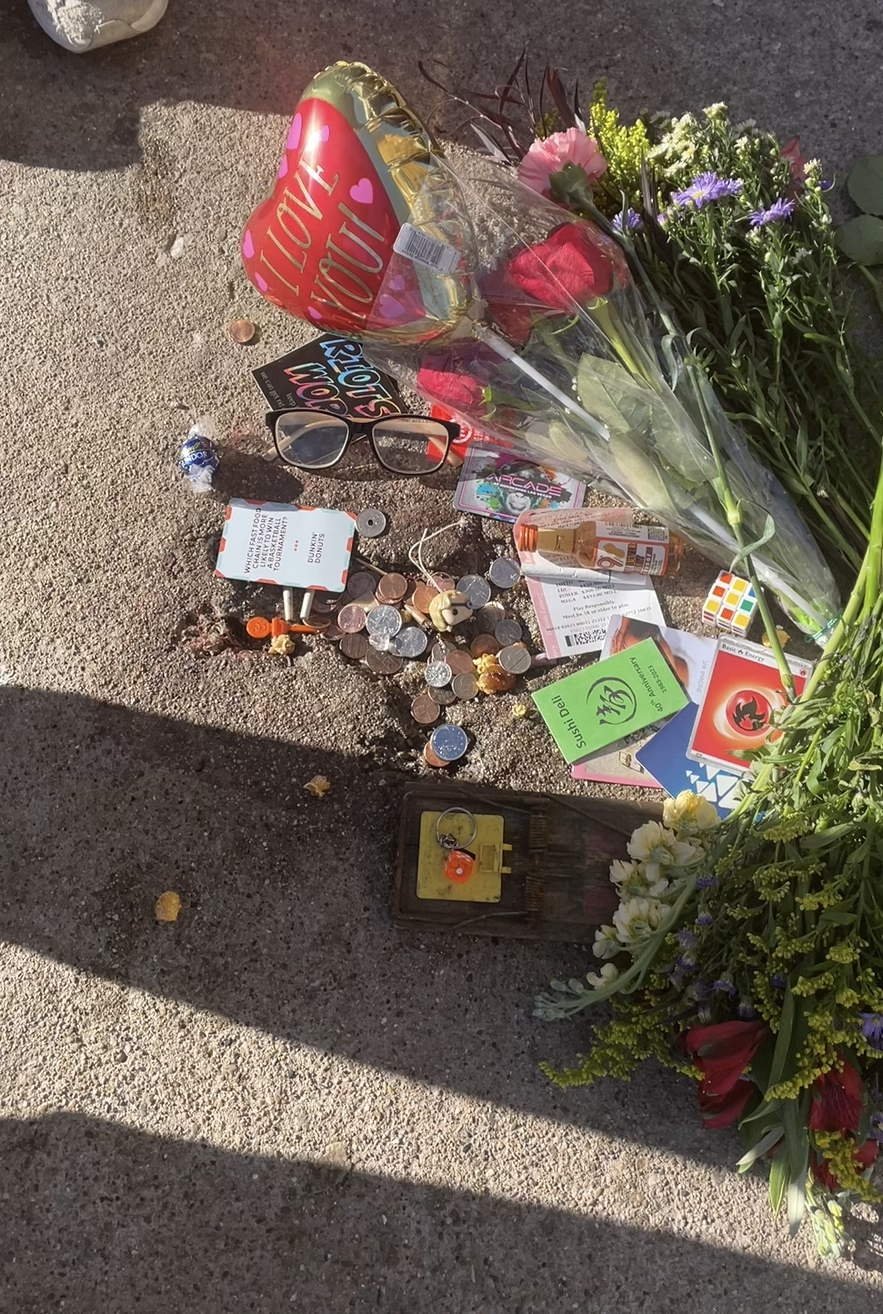
The hole on February 18, surrounded by gifts from visitors including flowers, coins, glasses, Pokémon cards, and a Clipper Card

== See also ==
- Our Lady of the Underpass – Salt stain under Chicago's Kennedy Expressway and pilgrimage site
- Petrosomatoglyph – Supposed image of parts of a human or animal body in rock
- Pinto Bean (squirrel) – American piebald squirrel (died 2022)
- Pizza Rat – Internet meme
- Pothole – Area of depressed road surface
- Trace fossil – Geological record of biological activity
- Conrad (raccoon) – Similar occurrence with a dead raccoon in Toronto, Canada
