= Jimothy =

Raccoon and internet meme (born c. 2025-2026)

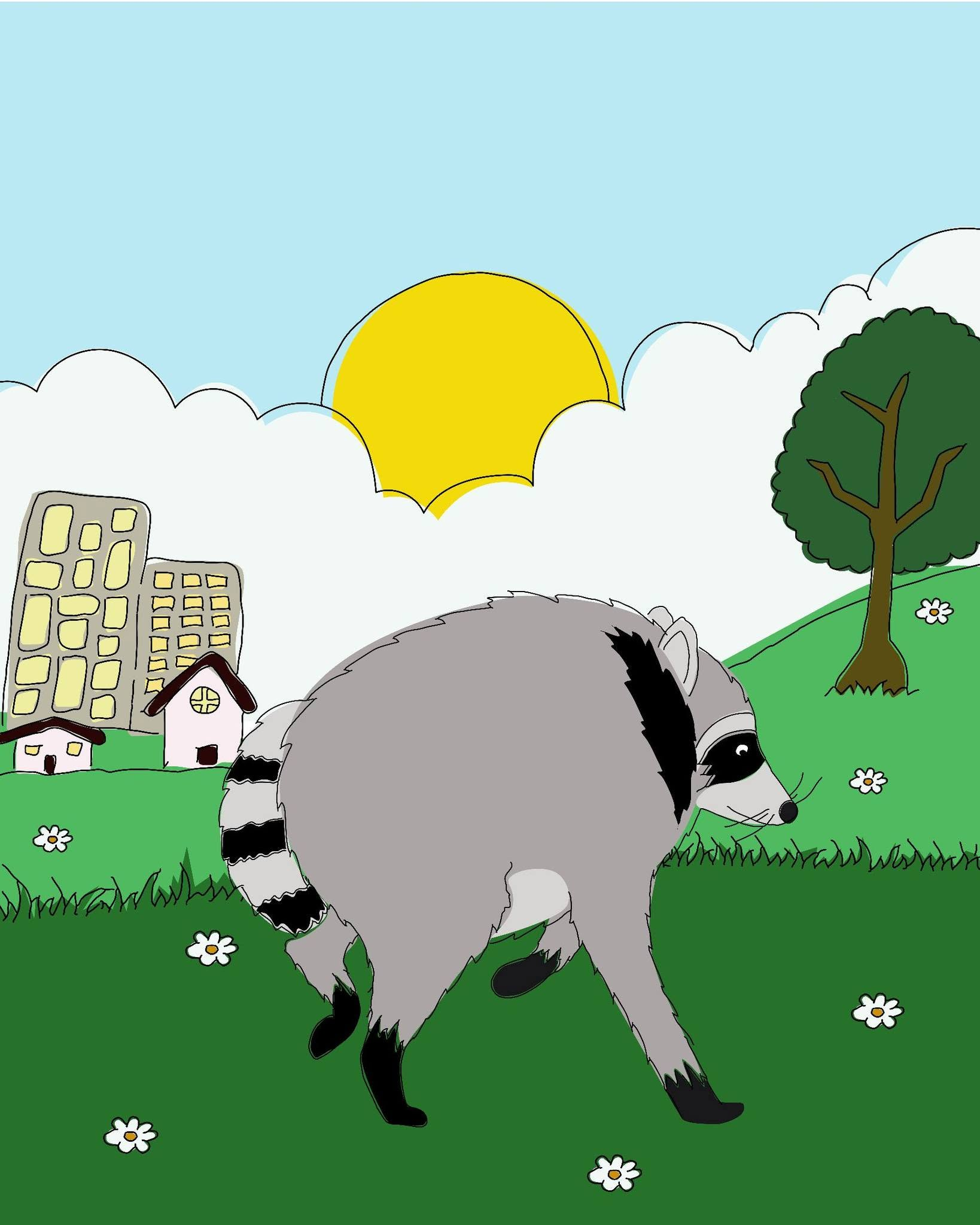
- An illustration of Jimothy published by the United States Geological Survey
- Species: Raccoon
- Sex: Unknown
- Born: est. 2026
- Known for: Abnormal body shape, internet memes

Jimothy (born est. 2026) is a wild raccoon living in Seattle, Washington, United States. His (Note: Jimothy's sex has not been determined. This article uses he/him for consistency with references.) unusual short, rounded shape, likely the result of a spinal deformity, led to him becoming a viral internet sensation in July 2026.

== History ==
In July 2026, Seattle resident Kiana Hall encountered the raccoon and posted a video on Instagram that went viral, leading to his widespread fame. In the video, she can be heard saying, "What am I looking at?" In its caption, she referred to him as "Jimothy", later saying, "He just looked like a Jimothy to me." Residents of Seattle's Ballard neighborhood said that Jimothy had lived in the area for months or years.

Animal experts believe Jimothy was born with a spinal deformity reported to be or resemble short spine syndrome, a disorder seen in dogs and, more rarely, other mammals. Jimothy is likely healthy for his species and appears to have no issues with mobility or pain. His survival with the condition is said to reflect a raccoon mother's care for her kit. Jimothy's sex has not been determined.

The Washington Department of Fish and Wildlife has urged individuals not to approach the raccoon, which appears healthy without human intervention, and the Seattle and King County health departments have cautioned that wild raccoons can carry bacteria and parasites that can be transmitted to humans.

As Jimothy's fame grew, residents and wildlife experts questioned whether more than one short-spined raccoon had lived in Ballard over the years, since wild raccoons typically live only three to five years. One such raccoon, who was nicknamed "Danny DeVito" after the actor, was an older individual filmed rolling across a lawn in August 2025, in footage sometimes mistaken for Jimothy. Some residents suspected this individual might be Jimothy's parent.

== Viral attention ==
External videos
- Instagram reel from c1vrgr1 (Kiana Hall) that originally led to Jimothy's viral attention

With Hall's footage posted via Instagram in July 2026, it gained 10 million views within one week. Jimothy became what The Seattle Times called a "scrappy hometown hero" and also rose to the status of an internet meme. Hall was called by media outlets worldwide including from Germany, the Philippines and New Zealand. His appearance has been compared to that of a cryptid, contributing to interest in the raccoon.

Tributes to Jimothy include tattoos, a mural, an honorary degree from the University of Washington, and recognition by the Seattle City Council, which declared that summer "Jimothy Summer". By July 22, Jimothy was made the subject of an easter egg on Google Search; upon searching his name, users are greeted with an animation of him running across the screen. Jimothy is included on Roku screensavers. The Seattle Mariners announced a "Jimothy Night" for their home game against the Detroit Tigers on August 5, featuring giveaways of an exclusive "Jimothy Rookie Card" and a T-shirt, with a portion of sales used to support the Ballard food bank; one gold-bordered edition of the card was sold on eBay by a 13 year old for over $20,000. A bobblehead manufacturer made available a Jimothy statuette, with proceeds donated to an animal rescue charity. A cryptocurrency was created using Jimothy as its concept.

ArenaNet added Jimothy as a non-player character and pet in Guild Wars 2, in part through Hall's spouse, who is a developer on the game. Blizzard Entertainment posted a tribute to Jimothy on social media, rendering him in the style of World of Warcraft and later added him as an in-game pet; Jagex made a similar tribute post in the style of Old School RuneScape. D&D Beyond released a Dungeons & Dragons stat block of Jimothy for use in the tabletop role-playing game. The map for Fortnite Chapter 7, Season 4, included graffiti of Jimothy visible near a point of interest, and later that season, players could earn a free Jimothy companion in the game. Modders have created add-ons involving Jimothy for various video games.

Some entrepreneurs have attempted to apply for intellectual property ownership around Jimothy, though from a U.S. legal standpoint, Jimothy has no legal owner and thus no one can claim rights to him.

== See also ==
- Conrad (raccoon)
- Harambe
- Moo Deng, a hippopotamus that gained online popularity in 2024
- Punch (monkey)
