= Tommy Tucker (squirrel) =

Celebrity American male Eastern gray squirrel

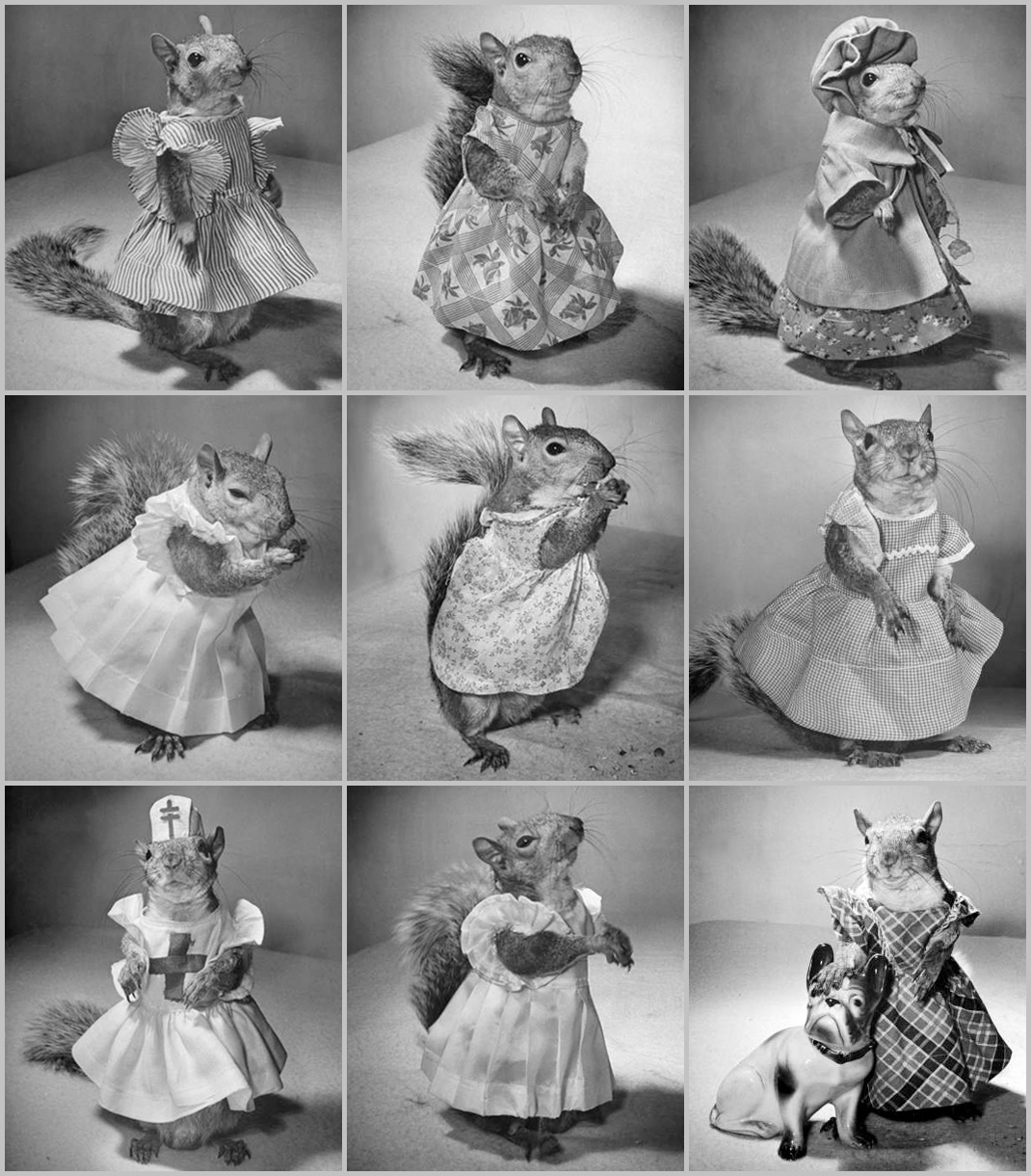
- Tommy Tucker in 1944 (Life magazine)
- Species: Sciurus carolinensis
- Sex: male
- Born: c. 1942; United States
- Died: June 25, 1949; Southwestern United States
- Years active: 1943–1949
- Known for: Selling war bonds
- Named after: Little Tommy Tucker (nursery-rhyme)

Tommy Tucker (c. 1942 – June 25, 1949) was a male Eastern gray squirrel who became a celebrity in the United States, touring the country wearing women's fashions while performing tricks, entertaining children, and selling war bonds. A Washington Post columnist called him "the most famous squirrel ever to come from Washington."

== World War II ==
While origin stories vary, Tommy was adopted in 1942 by Zaidee Bullis and her husband Mark C. Bullis, who may have named him after the 18th-century nursery-rhyme character Little Tommy Tucker. Zaidee dressed Tommy in women's clothing to avoid the tailoring around his bushy tail that a male wardrobe would entail. Following World War II Tommy "married" a squirrel named Buzzy.

In 1943 the Bullis family began taking Tommy on tour in their Packard automobile, accompanied by a bulldog said to have one or more gold teeth and often wearing a fez. Audiences were charmed by Tommy's lovingly crafted‍—‌often patriotic‍—‌attire and unusually docile demeanor (though he did sometimes bite). In an early show he performed for 500 elementary school students, and in conjunction with war bond sales Tommy gave a purported radio interview alongside President Franklin Roosevelt.

In 1944 Tommy was featured in Life magazine, complete with a gallery of photos by Nina Leen. The article noted that "Mrs. Bullis' main interest in Tommy ... is in dressing him up in 30 specially made costumes. Tommy has a coat and hat for going to market, a silk pleated dress for company, a Red Cross uniform for visiting the hospital."

In 1945, at the height of his fame, the Tommy Tucker Club had some 30,000 members.

Dear Tommy Tucker, I loved all of your dresses and I liked the wedding dress best of all.

— Letter from schoolgirl

== Later life ==
After the war, Tommy largely disappeared from headlines until 1948, when the Bullises were denied entry to California for several days when agricultural officials refused to recognize Tommy as a pet rather than a wild animal. At another point Tommy was barred from visiting Mexico.

Tommy died in the Bullises' trailer on June 25, 1949, while en route to one of the couple's "health and pleasure trips" to the Southwest United States, ostensibly due to "a heart attack brought on by old age" Tommy was remembered afterwards by some, such as an Arizona radio station that announced the "world infrequently notes the passing of a squirrel" on August 10, 1949.

His body was stuffed and mounted "with his arms out so you could pull the clothes over him." In 2005 Tommy's remains were offered to the Smithsonian, which however failed to show much interest. He is on view in a display case at a law office in Prince George's County, Maryland. The Archives Center at the National Museum of American History holds a collection of articles, papers, and photographs related to Tommy Tucker.

== See also ==
- Pinto Bean (squirrel)
