= Our Lady of the Underpass =

Salt stain under Chicago's Kennedy Expressway and pilgrimage site

Coordinates: 41.92518°N 87.68278°W

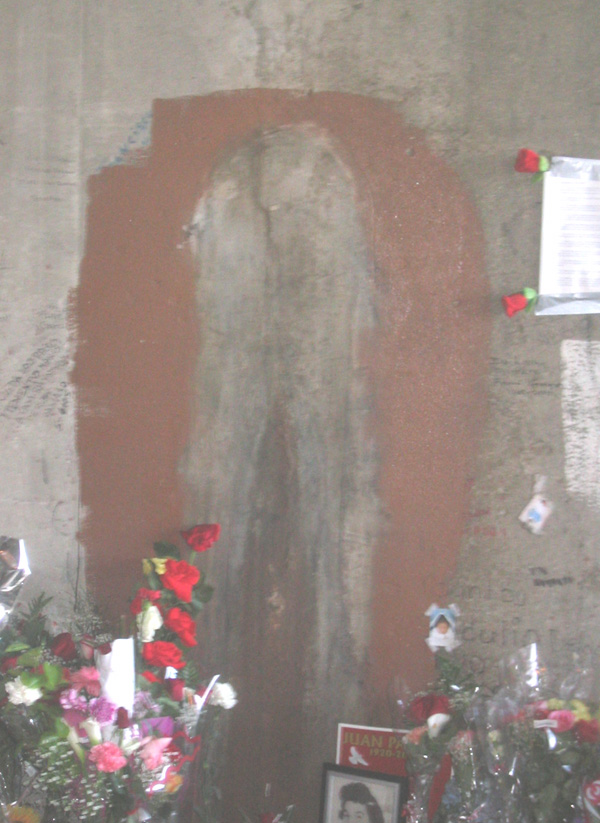
- Post-defacement, post-restoration photo of the stain, 2005
- Location: Fullerton Avenue under the Kennedy Expressway, Chicago, Illinois, United States
- Date: 2005
- Type: Efflorescence

Our Lady of the Underpass was a salt stain and purported appearance of the Virgin Mary under the Kennedy Expressway along Fullerton Avenue in Chicago that was noticed in 2005. The site became a pilgrimage site for local Catholics as well as a general curiosity. Later, it became a target for various acts of vandalism.

The Illinois Department of Transportation determined that the stain was likely formed by salt run-off. Skeptic Joe Nickell, writing for the science news website Live Science, described it as "merely another simulacrum—a 'Rorschach Icon' in which a random pattern is 'recognized' by the mind's tendency, known as pareidolia, to interpret vague images as specific ones." Cardinal George, the Archbishop of Chicago, described it as "a purely natural phenomenon" but also said, "God has many ways to stir up devotion in people's hearts. [...] If it's helpful in reminding people of the Virgin Mary's care for us and love for us, that's wonderful."

A play about the event by Tanya Saracho, entitled Our Lady of the Underpass, was commissioned by the Goodman Theatre, where it received a reading in 2006. It was nominated for a Jeff Award in 2009.

The It's Always Sunny in Philadelphia episode "The Gang Exploits a Miracle," released in 2007, parodies the story with a similar stain.

== See also ==
- Chicago rat hole – Rat-shaped hole in a Chicago sidewalk
