= Sheffield Avenue =

Road in Chicago, Illinois, USA

Coordinates: 41.9308°N 87.65374°W

- Joseph Sheffield Avenue; Morgan Street; 1000 West
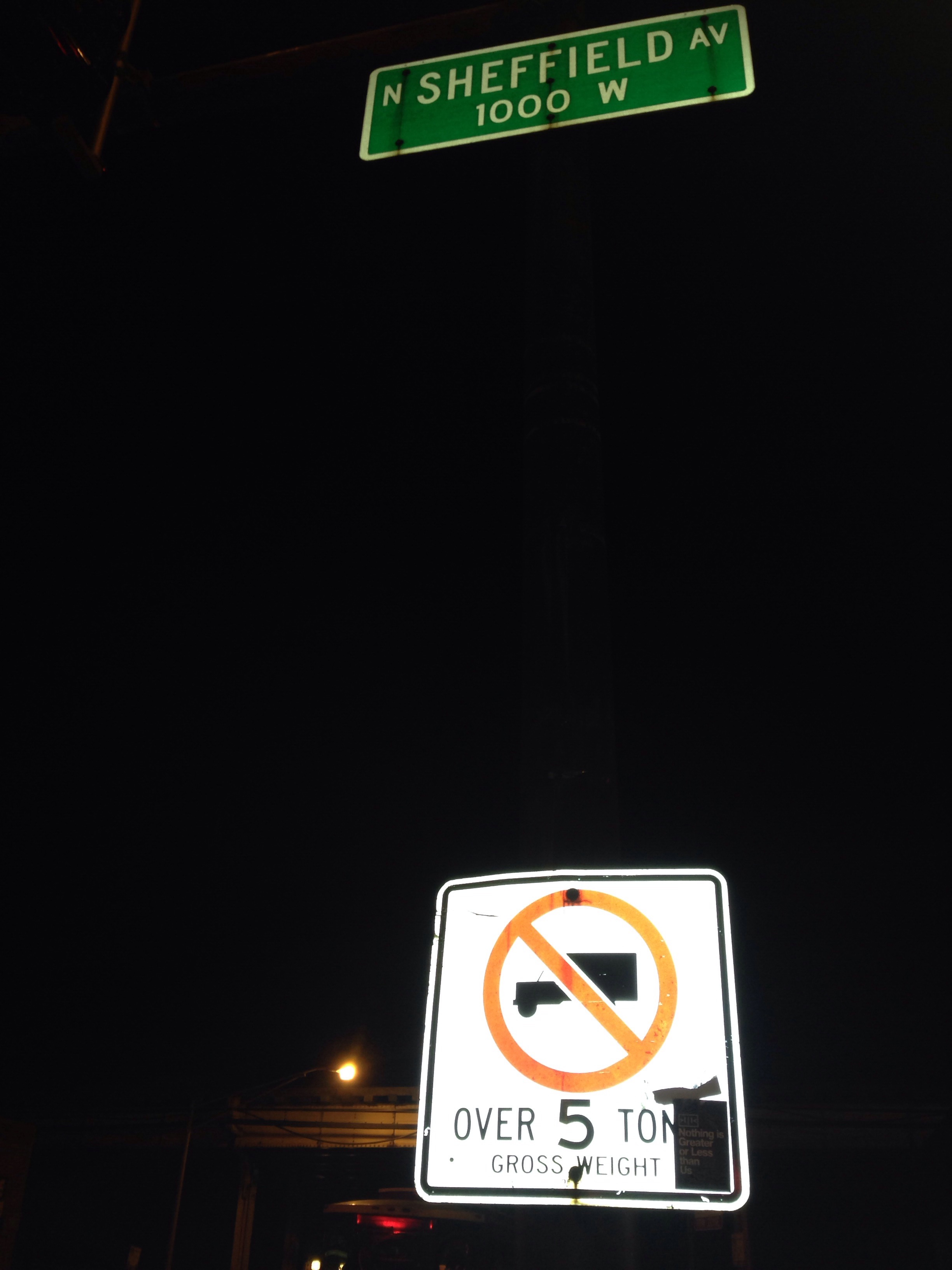
- Sheffield at N Lincoln Ave
- Interactive map of Sheffield Avenue
- Former name: 10th Avenue
- Location: Chicago
- South end: West Weed Street at Kingsbury Street (1500 N)
- North end: West Bryon Street at Sheridan Road (3900 N)

Sheffield Avenue is a north–south street in Chicago, Illinois. It is best known to sports fans as being the street just beyond the right-field bleachers of Wrigley Field.

Sheffield Avenue begins at the intersection with West Weed Street, immediately adjacent to Weed's intersection with North Kingsbury Street. The northern terminus is the intersection with West Byron Street (from the west) and West Sheridan Road (from the east). The street continues northward from that intersection as North Sheridan Road, a street name that is maintained northward all the way to Racine, Wisconsin.

North Sheffield Avenue runs parallel to and about 100 feet west of the CTA Red Line for nearly all of its length, and the Brown Line and Purple Line for much of it. Six CTA stations are on the parallel segment near Sheffield, and two more are within a quarter-mile of the street's ends. The avenue runs through the heart of the DePaul University campus and the Wrigleyville neighborhood.

In Chicago's grid system, 1000 W south of the North Branch River is known as Morgan Street, which runs through the city limits. The length of North Sheffield Avenue is three miles.

== Major intersections ==
The entire route is in Chicago, Cook County.

mi	km	Destinations	Notes
0.0	0.0	North Kingsbury Street / West Weed Street	Southern terminus
0.08	0.13	IL 64 (West North Avenue)	
3.0	4.8	West Byron Street / West Sheridan Road	Northern terminus
1.000 mi = 1.609 km; 1.000 km = 0.621 mi
