= Squirrel fishing =

Recreational activity

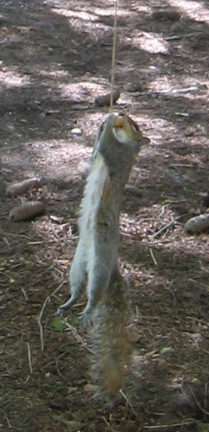
A squirrel being successfully lifted

Squirrel fishing is the practice of enticing squirrels and attempting to lift them into the air using a nut (such as a peanut) tied to a string or fishing line and optionally some kind of fishing pole.

There has been some debate over where modern squirrel fishing originated. Squirrel fishing occurred at least as early as 1889 in the United States. The practice was popularized either by Nikolas Gloy and Yasuhiro Endo at the Division of Engineering and Applied Sciences at Harvard University or by the Berkeley Squirrel Fisher's Club (BSF), an official student group at the University of California, Berkeley that has been featured in the campus newspaper. As of 2009, Ohio State University also had a squirrel fishing club. Michigan State University joined in 2015.
