= Eastern grey squirrels in Europe =

American eastern grey squirrels acclimated in Europe

Europe's grey squirrels (Sciurus carolinensis) originated in North America, where they are known as eastern gray squirrels (to differentiate from western gray squirrels). They eat large seeds, flowers, buds, fruits, fungi, some insects and occasionally bird eggs. They were first introduced into England, in a concerted way, in 1876, and through rapidly growing population and further introductions they spread to the rest of Great Britain by the early to mid-20th century. The eastern grey squirrel was introduced to Continental Europe in 1948 and has quickly taken advantage of Europe's food sources, habitats and lack of predators for grey squirrels. Genetic studies have shown that human intervention—released pets and intentional dispersal—may play a much larger role in the spread of grey squirrels than previously believed.

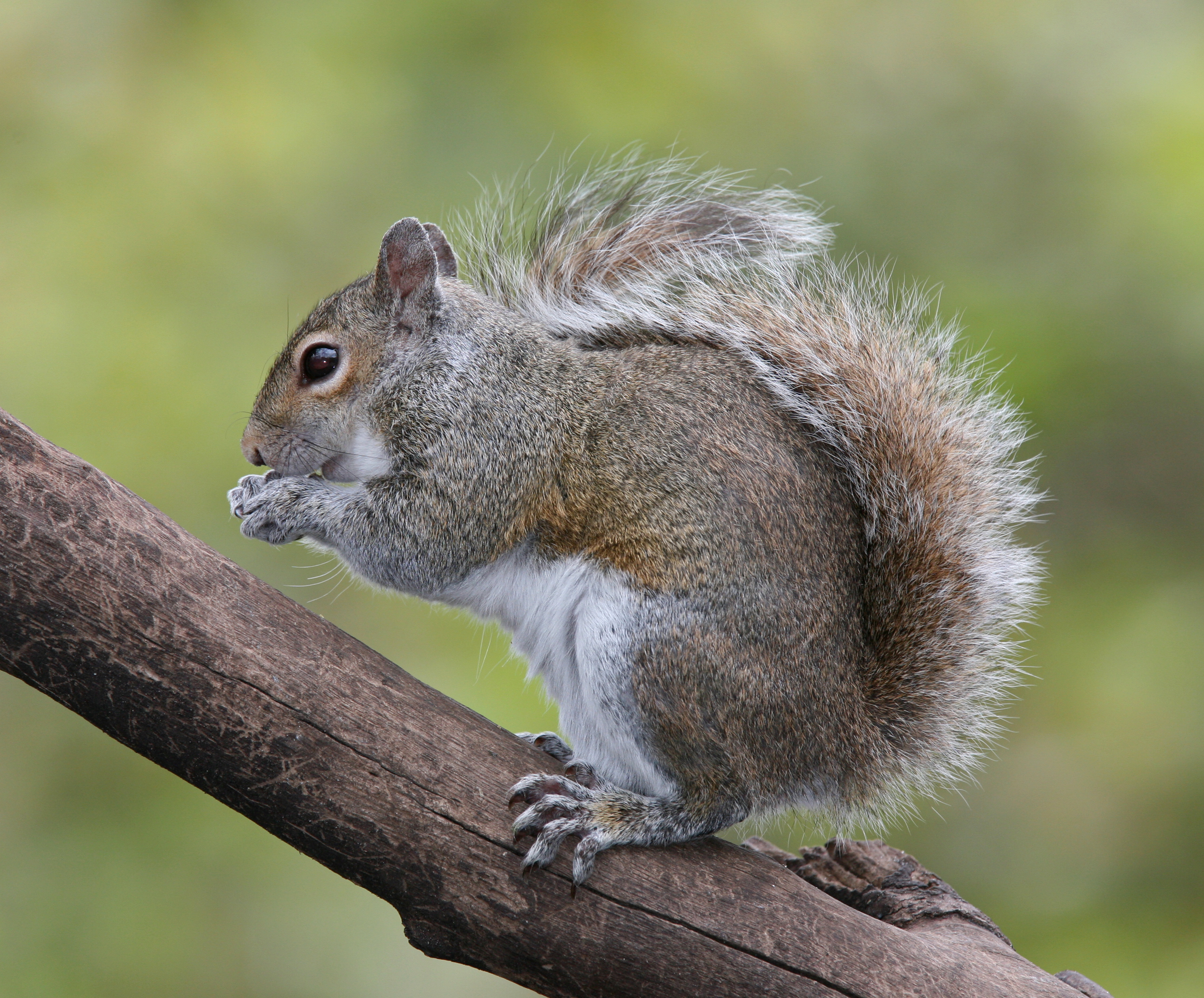
A grey squirrel, Sciurus carolinensis. Native to North America and invasive in Europe.

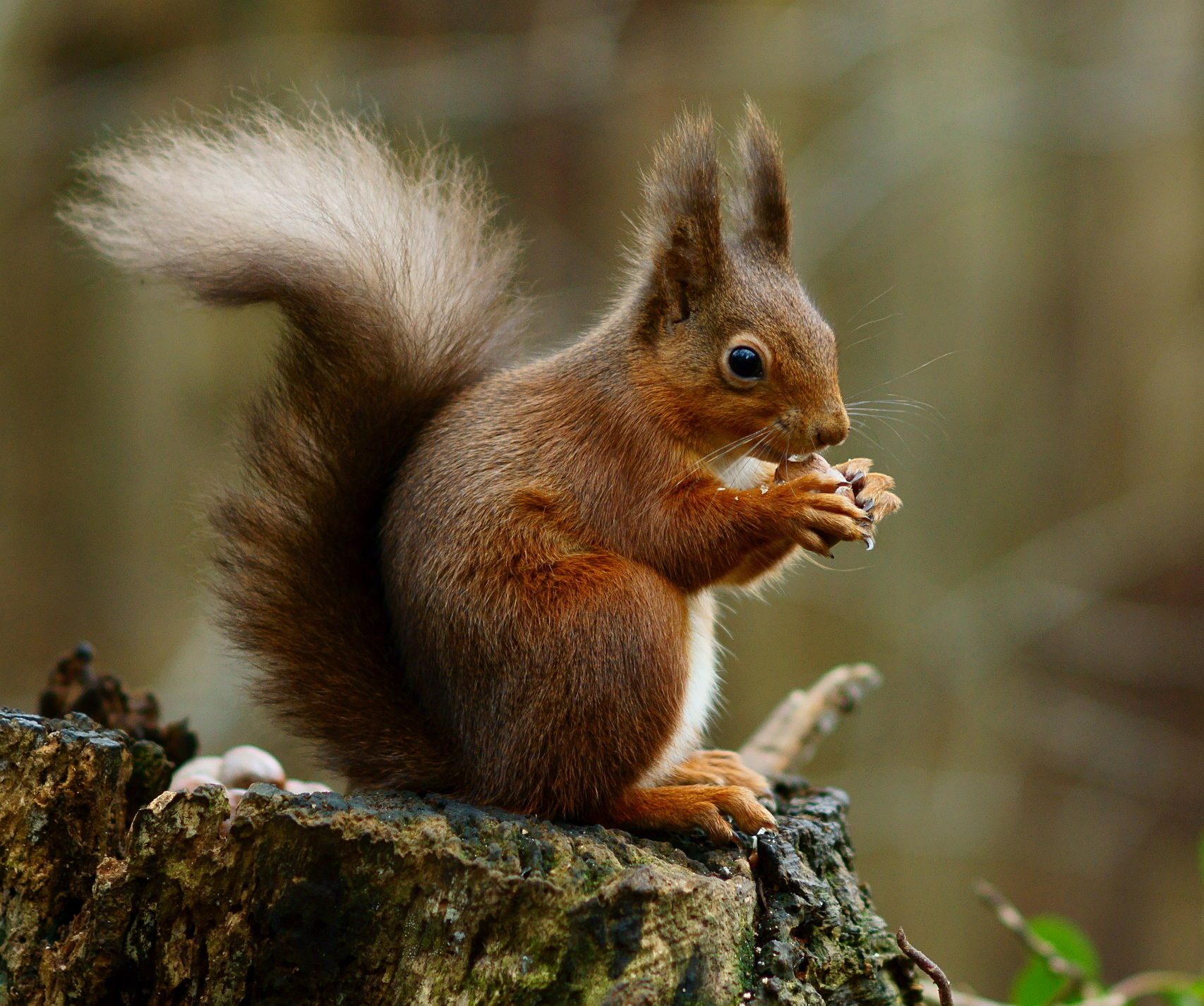
A red squirrel, Sciurus vulgaris. Native to Europe but largely displaced by the grey squirrel in some areas.

The native squirrel in Europe is the red squirrel (Sciurus vulgaris). Both species have similar diets, use similar habitats and have similar activity patterns; however, there is no evidence of noticeable aggression between the two species. These eastern grey squirrels are considered an invasive species in Europe because of their presence contributing to the displacement of the red squirrels.

The invasion of the grey squirrel in the United Kingdom can be classified as a Disease Mediated Invasion (DMI). More specifically, the invasion of the grey squirrels and displacement of the red squirrels can be described by "spillover DMI", which is defined as a non-native species bringing diseases with them into the new area that will infect the native species. Spillover is especially an issue when the invading species is morphologically similar to the native one. This can have devastating effects.

== Introduction of grey squirrel to Europe ==
Grey squirrels have been introduced either on purpose or by accident in many places throughout the world.

They were first introduced into England, in a concerted way, in 1876, and through rapidly growing population and further introductions they spread to the rest of Great Britain by the early to mid-20th century.

The first reported introduction of grey squirrels in continental Europe was in 1948, and they were taken to Stupinigi, Italy, where there is still a growing population. In Ireland, however, Lord Longford was said to have introduced the American squirrels into his estate in 1911. Then in 1966, five squirrels were introduced to Nervi, Italy in the park of Genoa. Later in 1994, three pairs were again released to a park in Trecate but were captured and removed in 1996. As stated before, not all grey squirrel introductions were intentional. For example, in 1966 two females and one male escaped from a game farm on Vancouver Island.

Almost 80% of known grey squirrel introductions worldwide resulted in successful establishment in the new area. Typically, grey squirrels do not need large numbers to start a new population. From studying all of the known successful introductions of this species, 71.4% used fewer than 10 individuals. This efficiency in the spread of grey squirrels can be explained by the enemy release hypothesis, which is when the invading species has better survival because its natural predators are not present. Also, natural parasites typically are not present in the area that the species has been introduced or has invaded. Because the grey squirrel poses such a threat to the trees and red squirrel in Europe, there is great effort to stop the further spread of the grey squirrels.

== Impact on other species ==
=== Competition for food ===
One of the biggest concerns about the grey squirrel as an invasive species is the effect introduction has on populations of red squirrels. Grey and red squirrels compete for resources, and greys will pilfer food caches of red squirrels. Reduction in red squirrel individual growth, juvenile recruitment, and reproductive success has been linked to competition between grey and red squirrels. In areas of large core overlap between red and grey squirrel populations, a reduction in body mass of red squirrels during the spring has been observed. This is most likely due to the fact that reds and greys participate in direct competition for limited resources, suggesting there is no niche partitioning occurring. This direct competition also explains a decrease in juvenile recruitment and reproductive success, as immature reds will die due to lack of resources before reaching sexual maturity.

=== Poxvirus ===
In addition to competition for resources, the spread of the squirrelpox virus from grey squirrels to reds is thought to be a major factor in the decline of red squirrel populations. Grey squirrels do not die from the squirrelpox virus and can infect red squirrels causing the appearance of scabs and lesions on the face, feet, and genitals and eventually death. In Great Britain, grey squirrels have been able to spread 17 to 25 times faster through competitive exclusion of the red squirrel due to increased mortality of reds from the squirrelpox virus. In fact, the virus works so quickly in killing its host after infection that seeing a red squirrel with poxvirus is uncommon even though the disease may be highly prevalent in a red squirrel population. The full consequences of these interactions cannot be completely determined, though the difference in population density and weight of the two species may have an effect on energy flow in ecosystems.

=== Woodland and songbird species ===
Grey squirrels also bear some of the responsibility for the decline of select woodland and songbird bird species as they sometimes feed on bird eggs and chicks. Although the grey squirrel is often blamed in part for this decline in the UK, this is probably not the case for populations introduced to Italy. In those populations, the greys mainly feed on "seeds, fruits, buds, flowers and, occasionally, on insects, switching from one resource to another according to seasonal availability".

=== Bark stripping ===
Certain behaviour of the grey squirrel, such as bark stripping, also has negative effects on trees and timber plantations. This is thought to be biggest effect introduced squirrels have on island ecosystems. For example, Garry oak trees on Vancouver Island have become endangered due to urban development and the presence of invasive species including the grey squirrel. Scatter-hoarding of seeds by grey squirrels causes notching in the acorns of white oaks. Notching prevents germination, which can hinder natural forest regeneration. Bark stripping makes branches weaker and more susceptible to being broken off by wind or animals and can also cause secondary infection that may lead to death. Bark stripping makes trees more susceptible to red band needle blight (RBNB), which is caused by the asexual stage of the fungus Dothistroma septosporum. RBNB results in a necrotrophic infection that kills needle tissue in pine species. Phytophthora ramorum is another fungus affecting tree health. Trees between 10 and 40 years of age and certain species, including beech and sycamore, are more vulnerable than others. Grey squirrels also damage trees by eating their sap, suggesting this behaviour provides some nutritional benefit.

== Predicted spread ==
=== Predicted spread throughout Europe ===
Spatially explicit population dynamics models were used by Bertolino et al. 2008 to predict the spread of the grey squirrel populations present in Italy in 1996: the Piedmont, Genoa and Ticino populations. The models examined potential corridors that would allow grey squirrels to invade France and Switzerland and the time scale of such invasions.

In a scenario based on a random pattern of good, poor and mast-year seed crops (vegetation produces significant abundance of food resources), in the "best-case" scenario, grey squirrels will reach the Western Alps between 2026 and 2036, France between 2066 and 2071, and Switzerland between 2051 and 2066. In a scenario where poor-year seed crops were not included, the "worst-case" scenario, grey squirrels will reach the Western Alps by 2015, France by 2026, and Switzerland between 2031 and 2041.

Along the border between France and Italy, the forest cover is mainly composed of mixed broadleaf trees; this represents a likely corridor to France for the grey squirrel. Mixed deciduous woodland lines the river Ticino; this area connects with contiguous hardwood on the side of Lake Maggiore in Switzerland, making the area along the Ticino a likely corridor for the grey squirrel to invade Switzerland. The upper portion of the Alps is covered largely by coniferous forest. Grey squirrels, which are heavier than native red squirrels, have a higher energy requirement than red squirrels. It may be difficult for the grey squirrels to attain their higher energy requirement in this environment because they may have difficulty reaching the small seeds contained in the conifers' cones; for this reason, grey squirrel performance in this habitat will affect the spread of the species. Eventually, if populations are left unchecked, the grey squirrel will spread through a large portion of continental Europe and Eurasia, potentially invading the entire global distribution of the red squirrel.

=== Predicted spread of the poxvirus and damage to trees ===
The squirrelpox virus is predicted to spread by the grey squirrels as they act as a vector for the virus. Further, a separate model examining the effects of the spread of the grey squirrel on the health of Scots and lodgepole pines showed that grey squirrels will spread red band needle blight, decreasing the population of lodgepole pines exponentially, and that Scots pine populations will decrease slower due to fungal growth resulting from the bark-stripping behaviour of the grey squirrel.

=== Continued spread after attempted eradication ===
In 1991, eradication of a grey squirrel population in Piedmont was attempted via trapping and euthanasia; however, this effort was suspended for three years after animal rights groups filed a lawsuit. During the three-year suspension, the grey squirrel population had grown so much that it was no longer feasible to attempt eradication by the methods initially used. If the species spreads significantly (the three populations in Italy invade France or Switzerland and establish successful populations outside of Italy) before preventative or eradicative efforts are taken, it will, in all probability, be too late for effective action.

== Natural predator ==
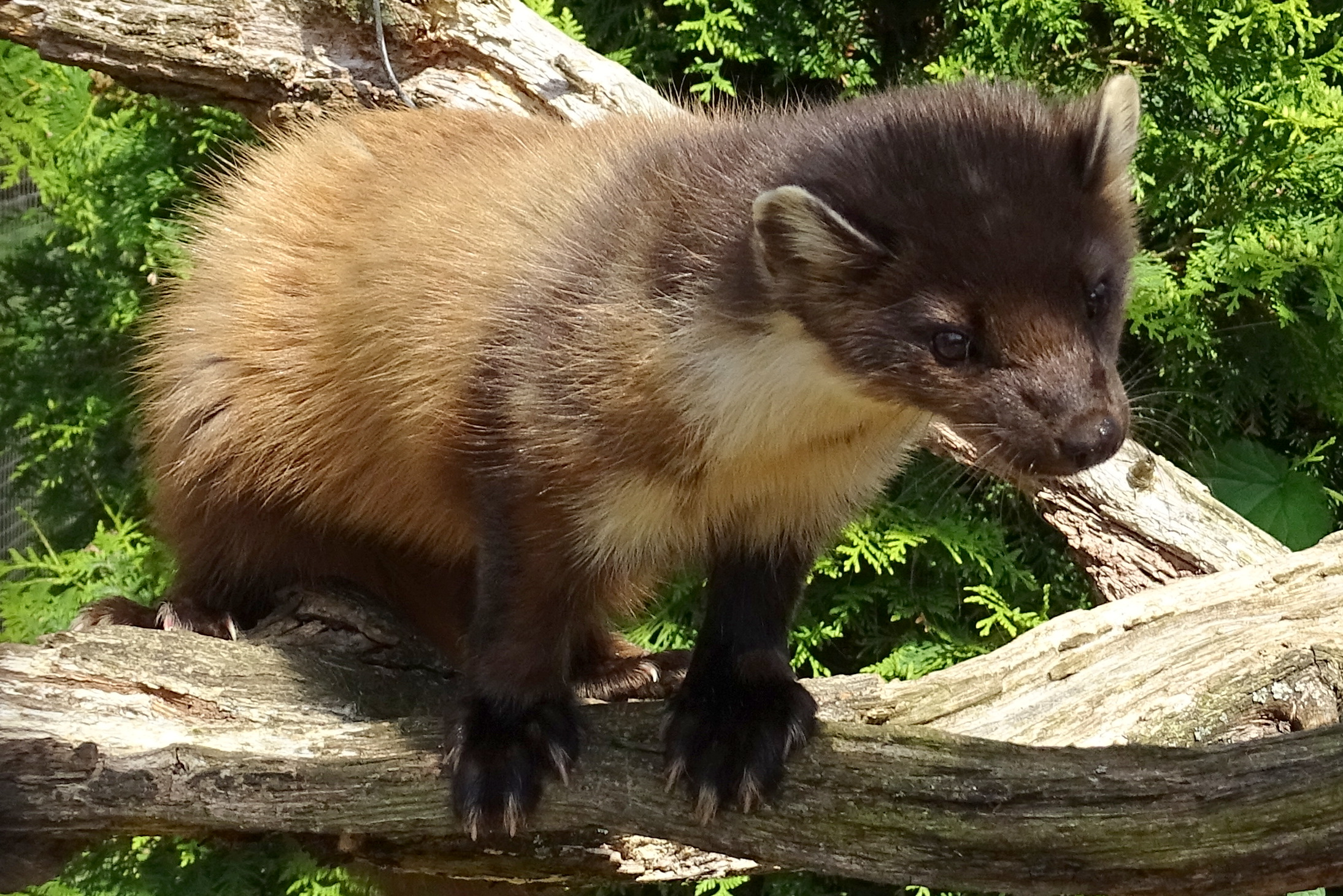
European pine martens have kept grey squirrel populations in check in Ireland

The European pine marten is a natural predator of squirrels, including the eastern grey squirrel, but has been eradicated from large parts of the area affected by the grey squirrel such as England and Wales. The European pine marten's population is currently expanding and there is evidence that grey squirrel populations plummet where it becomes present, with the populations of the co-evolved red squirrel subsequently recovering.

== Proposed plans for control or eradication ==
Although the negative consequences of introduction of non-native species are generally known in the scientific community, the majority of the public is unaware of the effects on native ecosystems.

Effective control of the spreading of grey squirrels throughout continental Europe will require a coordinated approach of many nations, and ecologists recommend public education and trade restrictions as primary means to prevent new introductions of non-native species. Currently, the release of non-native species is illegal in most European countries, but both illegal and allowed importations and escapes of grey squirrels from captivity pose threats to native red squirrel and tree populations.

In addition to preventing introduction of grey squirrels, containment and eradication could serve to control the species’ invasive actions. Methods for grey squirrel population control depend on the target of protection. In the presence of red squirrels, cage trapping or shooting can be effective. In the absence of red squirrels, poisoning by the anticoagulant Warfarin can be used in special feeding hoppers. These methods are currently effectively controlling the grey squirrel population in Britain. Selectively timed culls, or removal of a percentage of the breeding individuals, of grey squirrel populations can help control and prevent tree damage. Although grey squirrel populations readily recover from culls, their coincidence with annual periods of the greatest damage to trees, typically between April and September when the squirrels are most active in foraging among broadleaf tree populations, can minimize tree damage.

Alternatively, non-lethal methods of population control, such as fertility treatments, are being developed, although the effectiveness of these treatments is unknown. In areas most threatened by spread of grey squirrels, eradication may be more effective than population containment. Eradication of the population of grey squirrels in Genoa would protect two native subspecies of red squirrel, Sciurus vulgaris italicus and Sciurus vulgaris meridionalis, in south-east Italy, and eradication of the grey squirrel population in Ticino would eliminate the threat of grey squirrel invasion into Switzerland for the next 100 years. While these efforts are supported by ecologists, their success will depend on public opinion, governmental support, and awareness of the situation.
