= Gaetano Perratone Armandi =

Italian painter

Gaetano Perratone Armandi (February 27, 1851–after 1890) was an Italian painter, mainly of landscapes.

== Biography ==
He was born and a resident of Turin. He trained in design at the Accademia Albertina, but in 1871 also received a diploma in law studies at the University. After graduating he sought to study under Giulio Vioti. He was prolific mainly with landscapes, depicting views of the Valley of Andorno, the mountains of Savoy, and other Alpine regions. In 1880, he exhibited at Turin Giorno che fu, and at the 1883 Exhibition of Rome, he exhibited a Veduta of Gressoney. At the 1884 Mostra Nazionale of Turin he displayed The forest of Stupinigi.

Other works include Sui Monti, Tempo Bizarro, and Note Boscherrecie.
