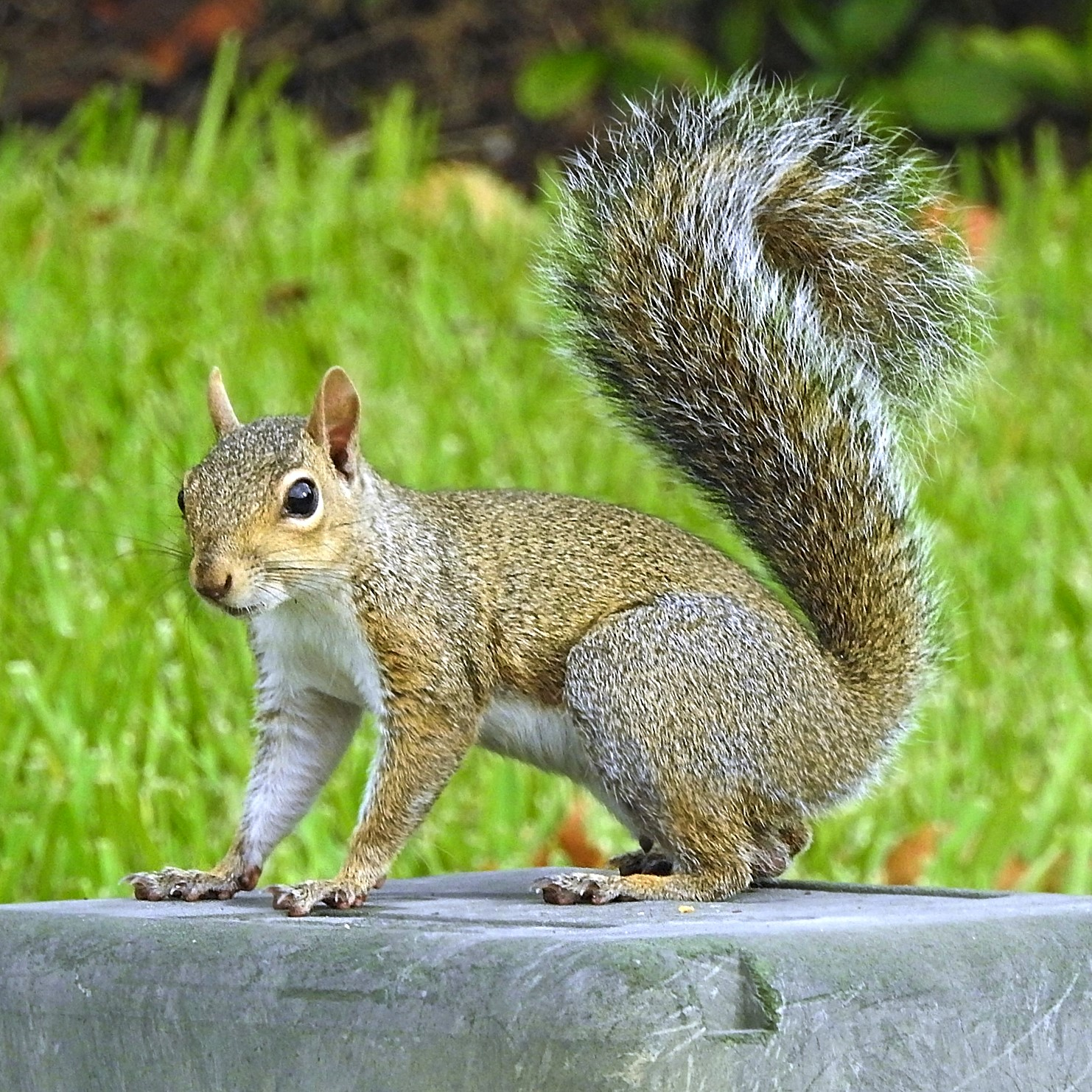

Conservation status
- Least Concern (IUCN 3.1)

- Secure (NatureServe)

Scientific classification
- Kingdom: Animalia
- Phylum: Chordata
- Class: Mammalia
- Order: Rodentia
- Family: Sciuridae
- Genus: Sciurus
- Subgenus: Sciurus
- Species: S. carolinensis

Binomial name
- Sciurus carolinensis Gmelin, 1788

Subspecies
- S. c. carolinensis; S. c. extimus; S. c. fuliginosus; S. c. hypophaeus; S. c. pennsylvanicus; S. c. leucotis
- Native range in red

Synonyms
- Neosciurus carolinensis; S. pennsylvanica; S. hiemalis; S. leucotis; S. fulginosus; S. migratorius

Audio
- Calls recorded in Surrey, England

= Eastern gray squirrel =

Eastern gray squirrel Temporal range: Late Pleistocene – present (19,000–0 YBP)

Species of squirrel native to North America

The eastern gray squirrel (Sciurus carolinensis), spelled as grey squirrel outside of the United States, is a species of tree squirrel in the genus Sciurus. It is native to eastern North America, where it is the most prodigious and ecologically essential natural forest regenerator. Widely introduced to certain places around the world, the eastern gray squirrel in Europe, in particular, is regarded as an invasive species.

In Europe, Sciurus carolinensis is included (since 2016) in the list of Invasive Alien Species of Union concern (the Union list). This implies that this species cannot be imported, bred, transported, commercialized, or intentionally released into the environment in the whole of the European Union.

== Distribution ==
Sciurus carolinensis is native to the eastern and midwestern United States, and to the southerly portions of the central provinces of Canada. In the mid-1800s, the population in the midwestern United States was described as being "truly astonishing," but human predation and habitat destruction through deforestation resulted in drastic population reductions, to the point that the animal was almost absent from Illinois by 1900.

The native range of the eastern gray squirrel overlaps with that of the fox squirrel (Sciurus niger), with which it is sometimes confused, although the core of the fox squirrel's range is slightly more to the west. The eastern gray squirrel is found from New Brunswick, through southwestern Quebec and throughout southern Ontario plus in southern Manitoba, south to East Texas and Florida. Breeding eastern gray squirrels are found in Nova Scotia, but whether this population was introduced or came from natural range expansion is not known.

A prolific and adaptable species, the eastern gray squirrel has also been introduced to, and thrives in, several regions of the western United States. In 1966, this squirrel was introduced onto Vancouver Island in Western Canada in the area of Metchosin, where it is considered highly invasive and a threat to both the local ecosystem and the native squirrel, the American red squirrel.

Overseas, eastern gray squirrels in Europe are a concern because they have displaced some of the native squirrels there. For example, in Britain, they have largely displaced the red squirrel; in Ireland, they compete with the Eurasian red squirrel. They have also been introduced into Italy, South Africa, and Australia (where they were extirpated by 1973).

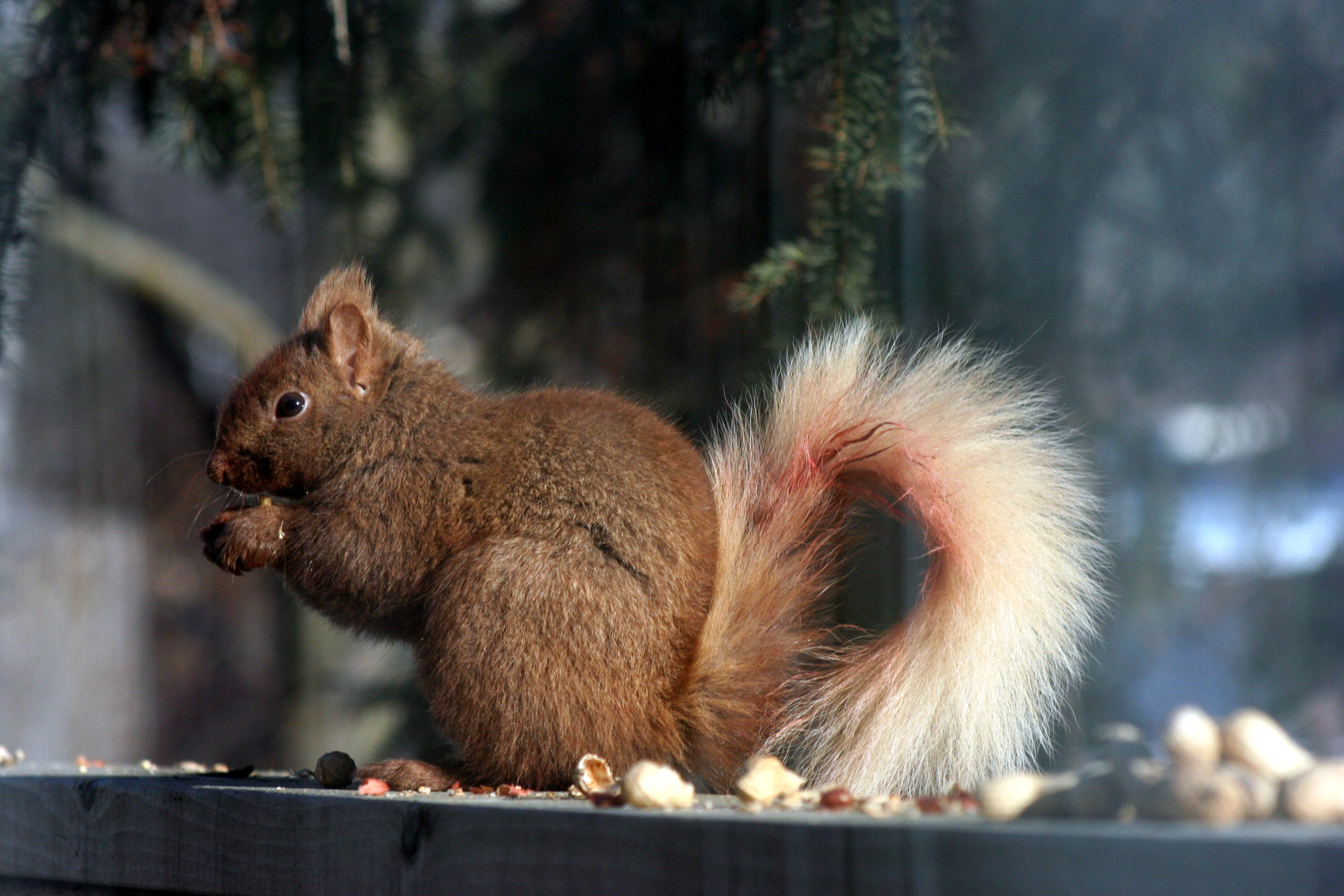
Brown morph, in Ontario

=== Fossil record ===
S. carolinensis is known to have occurred at least 18 times throughout the North American Pleistocene fossil record, across eight different US states, (Note: These are (not counting the single fossil specimen from South Carolina): Florida, Kentucky, Maryland, Missouri, Pennsylvania, Tennessee, Texas, and Virginia.) with some fossils allegedly dating back as early as the late Irvingtonian period. Body size seems to have increased during the early to middle Holocene and then decreased to the present size seen today.

A single fossil specimen (held and cataloged by South Carolina State Museum's natural history collection as SC93.105.172–.174) is known from the Ardis local fauna site in Harleyville, South Carolina. This specimen consists of a partial humerus (.172) and two partial tibiae (.173, .174), which are anatomically indistinguishable from that of contemporary S. carolinensis. Surrounding fossil material from the site has been dated back to 18,940–18,530 years ago, during the Late Pleistocene (late Rancholabrean) epoch, and indicates that the site was likely a hardwood-conifer swamp during this time.

== Etymology ==
The generic name, Sciurus, is derived from two Greek words, skia 'shadow' and oura 'tail'. This name alludes to the squirrel sitting in the shadow of its tail. The specific epithet, carolinensis, refers to the Carolinas, where the species was first recorded and where the animal is still extremely common. In the United Kingdom and Canada, it is simply referred to as the "grey squirrel". In the US, "eastern" is used to differentiate the species from the western gray squirrel (Sciurus griseus).

== Characteristics ==
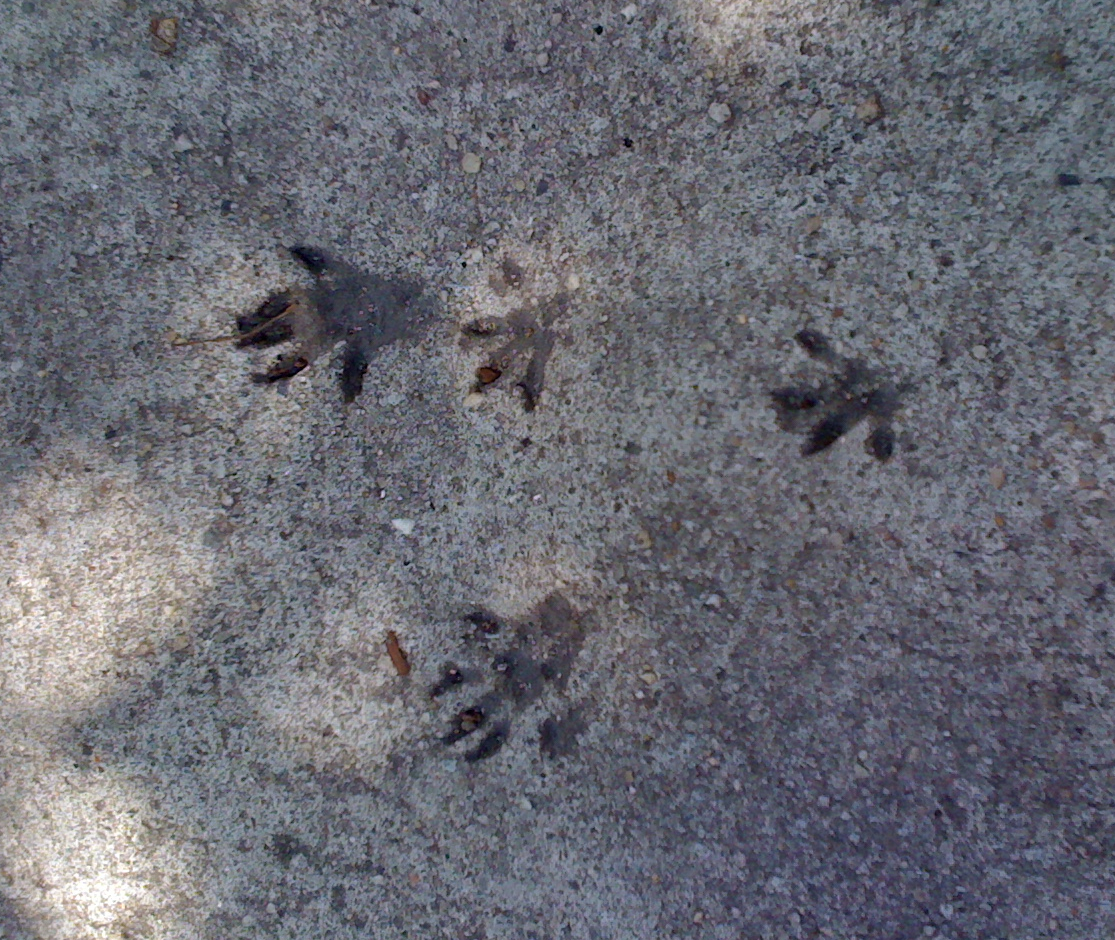
Bounding tracks in concrete

The eastern gray squirrel has predominantly gray fur with brown spots and streaks. It has a white underside as compared to the brownish-orange underside of the fox squirrel; both exhibit countershading. It has a large bushy tail. Particularly in urban situations where the risk of predation is reduced, both white-colored and black-colored individuals are quite often found. The melanistic form, which is almost entirely black, is predominant in certain populations and in certain geographic areas, such as in large parts of southeastern Canada. Melanistic squirrels appear to exhibit a higher cold tolerance than the common gray morph; when exposed to −10 °C, black squirrels showed an 18% reduction in heat loss, a 20% reduction in basal metabolic rate, and an 11% increase to non-shivering thermogenesis capacity when compared to the common gray morph. The black coloration is caused by an incomplete dominant mutation of MC1R, where E^{+}/E^{+} is a wild type squirrel, E^{+}/E^{B} is brown-black, and E^{B}/E^{B} is black.

The head and body length is from 23 to 30 cm (9.1 to 11.8 in), the tail from 19 to 25 cm (7.5 to 9.8 in), and the adult weight varies between 400 and 600 g (14 and 21 oz). They do not display sexual dimorphism, meaning there is no gender difference in size or coloration.

The tracks of an eastern gray squirrel are difficult to distinguish from the related fox squirrel and Abert's squirrel, though the latter's range is almost entirely different from the gray's. Like all squirrels, the eastern gray shows four toes on the front feet and five on the hind feet. The hind foot-pad is often not visible in the track. When bounding or moving at speed, the front foot tracks will be behind the hind foot tracks. The bounding stride can be 60 to 90 cm (2 to 3 ft) long.

The dental formula of the eastern gray squirrel is 1.0.2.31.0.1.3, for a total of 22 teeth.

Incisors exhibit indeterminate growth, meaning they grow consistently throughout life (as is true for all rodents), and their cheek teeth exhibit brachydont (low-crowned teeth) and bunodont (having tubercles on crowns) structures.

Colour mutations

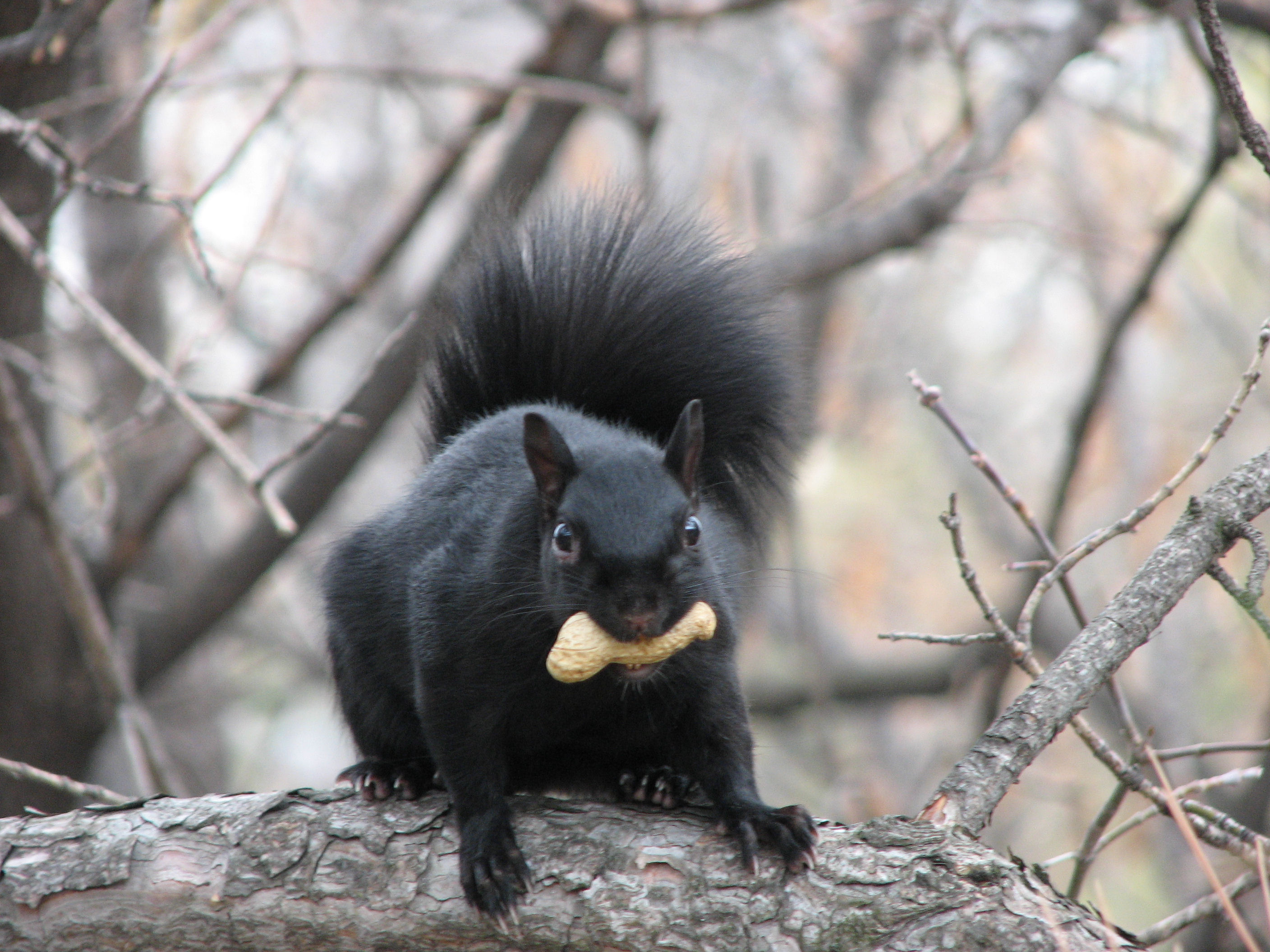
Melanistic

Melanistic with red tail

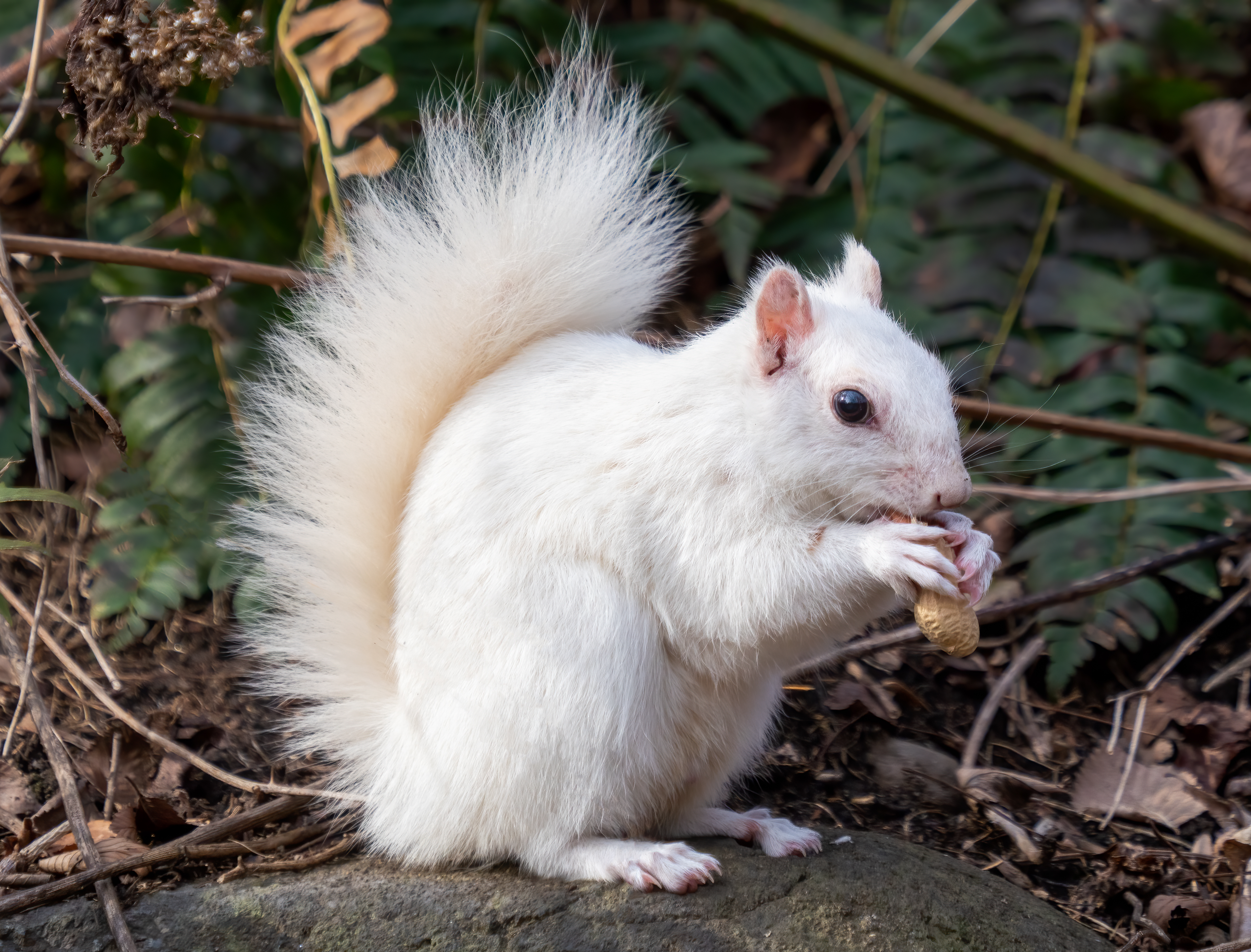
Leucistic

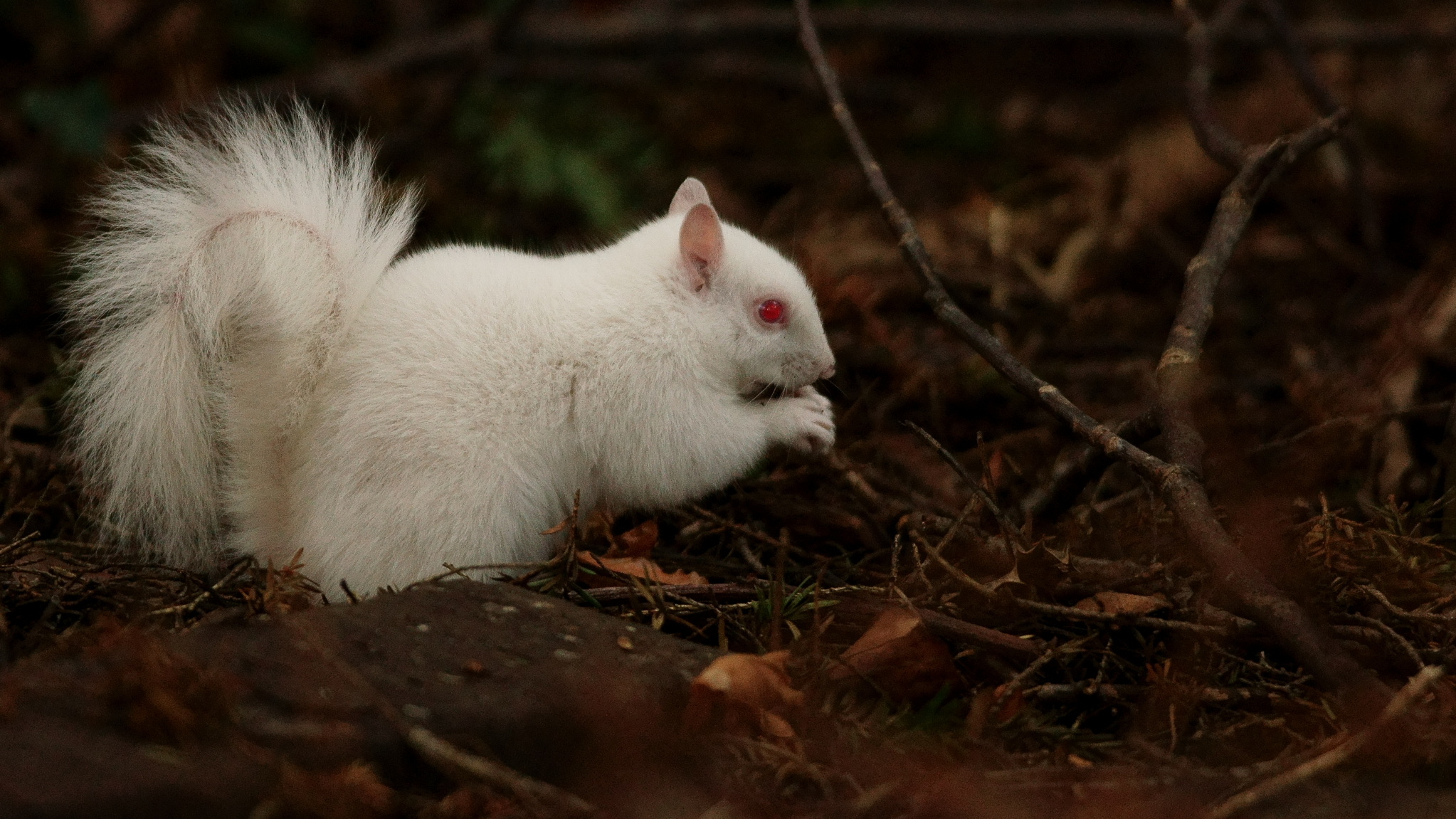
Albino

=== Growth and ontogeny ===
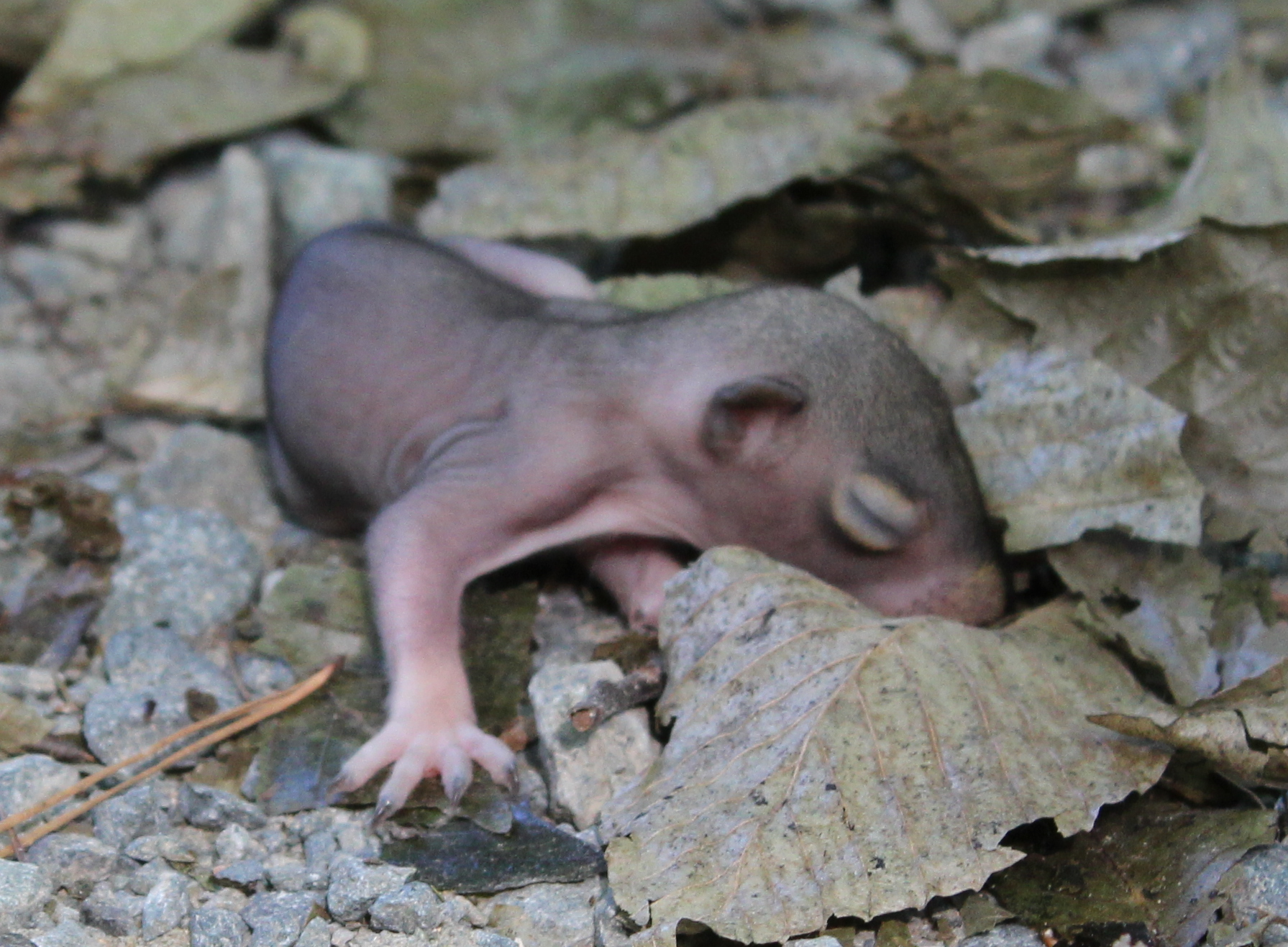
Newborn gray squirrel developing fur. They are born hairless and blind.

Newborn squirrels are called kits, kittens, or pups. They weigh 13–18 g (0.5–0.6 oz) at birth. They are born blind, entirely hairless, and pink with whiskers present at birth. 7–10 days postpartum, the skin begins to darken, just before the juvenile pelage grows in. Lower incisors erupt 19–21 days postpartum, while upper incisors erupt after 4 weeks. Cheek teeth erupt during week 6. Eyes open after 21–42 days, and ears open 3–4 weeks postpartum. Weaning is initiated around 7 weeks postpartum, and is usually finished by week 10, followed by the loss of the juvenile pelage. Full adult body mass is achieved by 8–9 months after birth.

=== Diseases ===
Diseases such as typhus, plague, and tularemia are spread by eastern gray squirrels. If not properly treated, these diseases have the potential to kill squirrels. When bitten or exposed to bodily fluids, humans can contract these diseases. Eastern gray squirrels may also carry parasites such as ringworm, fleas, lice, mites, and ticks which can kill their squirrel host. Their skin may become rough, blotchy, and prone to hair loss due to the mite parasite during the chilly winter months. The parasites are not transferred to people when these squirrels reside in attics or homes. A frequent illness spread by ticks is Lyme disease. Ticks can also spread Rocky Mountain spotted fever. It can result in damage to internal organs including the heart and kidney if not properly treated. An eastern gray squirrel is susceptible to diseases including fibromatosis and squirrelpox. A squirrel with fibromatosis, a virus-induced illness, may grow massive skin tumors all over the body. Blindness could result from a tumor that is located close to a squirrel's eye.

== Behavior and ecology ==
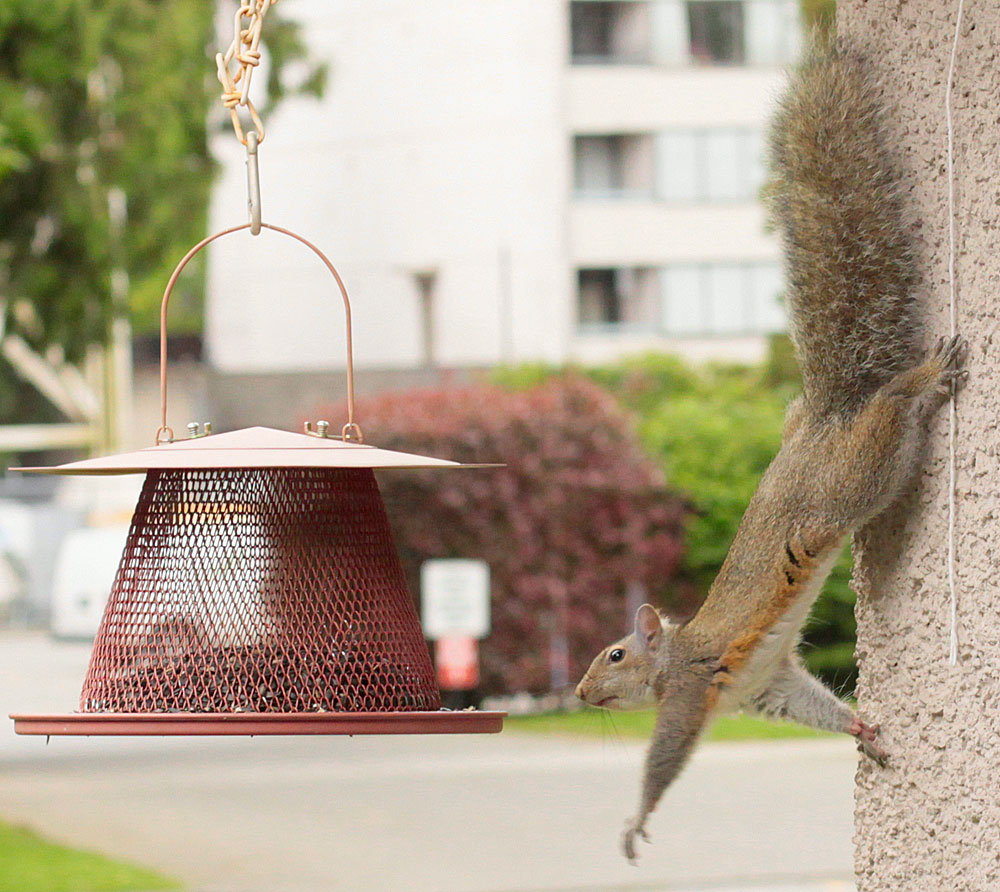
Reaching out for food on a garden bird feeder, this squirrel can rotate its hind feet, allowing it to descend a tree head-first.

The eastern gray squirrel is one of very few mammalian species that can descend a tree head-first. It does this by turning its feet so the claws of its hind paws are backward-pointing and can grip the tree bark.

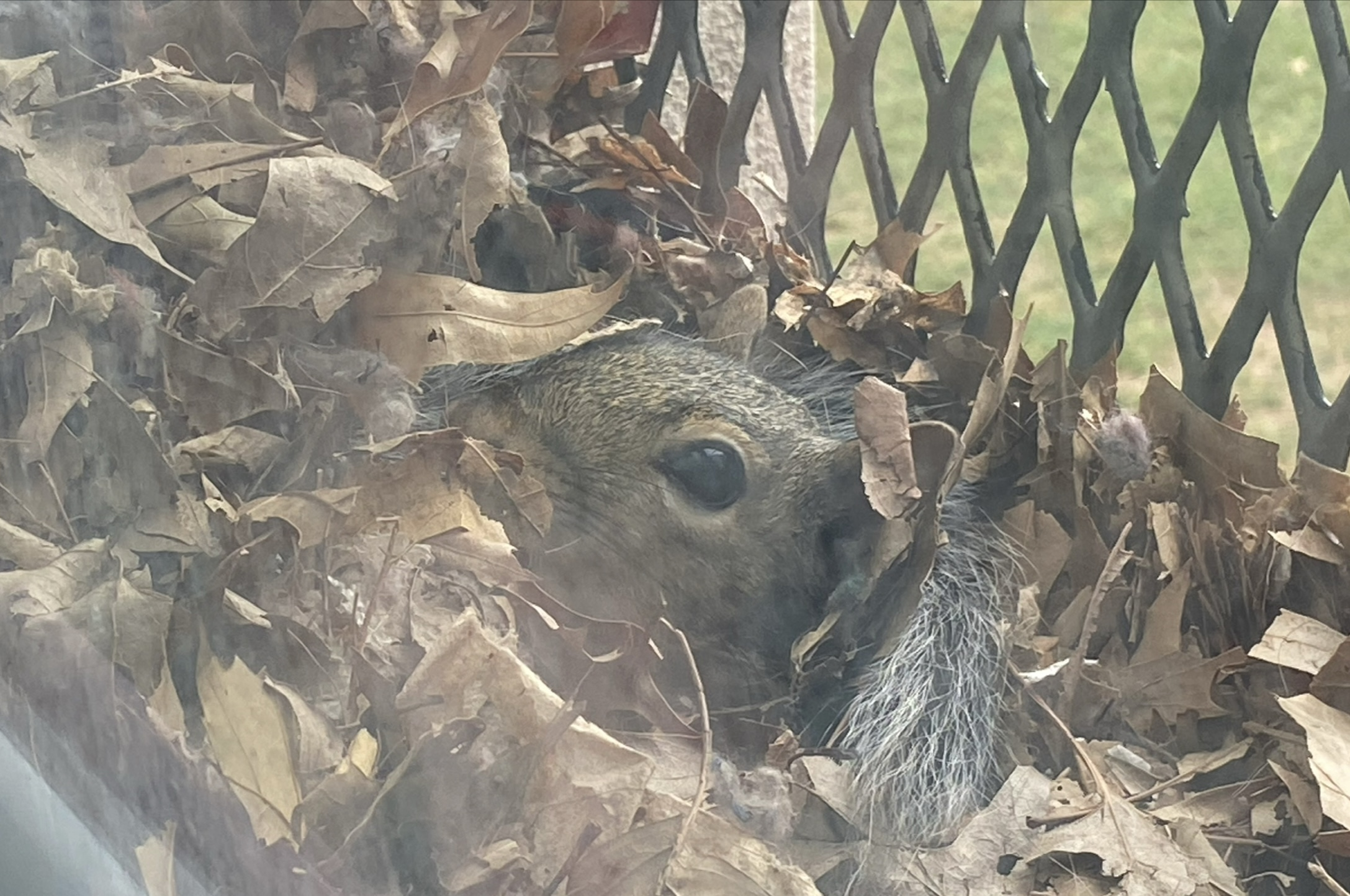
A gray squirrel in a drey located in a window.

Eastern gray squirrels build a type of nest, known as a drey, in the forks of trees, consisting mainly of dry leaves and twigs. The dreys are roughly spherical, about 30 to 60 cm in diameter and are usually insulated with moss, thistledown, dried grass, and feathers to reduce heat loss. Males and females may share the same nest for short times during the breeding season, and during cold winter spells. Squirrels may share a drey to stay warm. They may also nest in the attic or exterior walls of a house, where they may be regarded as pests, as well as fire hazards due to their habit of gnawing on electrical cables. In addition, squirrels may inhabit a permanent tree den hollowed out in the trunk or a large branch of a tree.

Eastern gray squirrels exhibit diurnal or crepuscular behavior depending on the season, and tend to avoid the heat in the middle of a summer day. They do not hibernate.

=== Reproduction ===
Eastern gray squirrels can breed twice a year, but younger and less experienced mothers normally have a single litter per year in the spring. Depending on forage availability, older and more experienced females may breed again in summer. In a year of abundant food, 36% of females bear two litters, but none will do so in a year of poor food. Reproduction is also strongly tied to mast years of seed-producing trees, as both litter size and amount of lactation decrease during food-poor years.

Their breeding seasons are December to February and May to June, though this is slightly delayed in more northern latitudes. The first litter is born in February or March, the second in June or July, though, again, bearing may be advanced or delayed by a few weeks depending on climate, temperature, and forage availability. In any given breeding season, an average of 61 – 66% of females bear young. If a female fails to conceive or loses her young to unusually cold weather or predation, she re-enters estrus and has a later litter. Five days before a female enters estrus, she may attract up to 34 males from up to 500 meters away. Eastern gray squirrels exhibit a form of polyandry, in which the competing males will form a hierarchy of dominance, and the female will mate with multiple males depending on the hierarchy established.

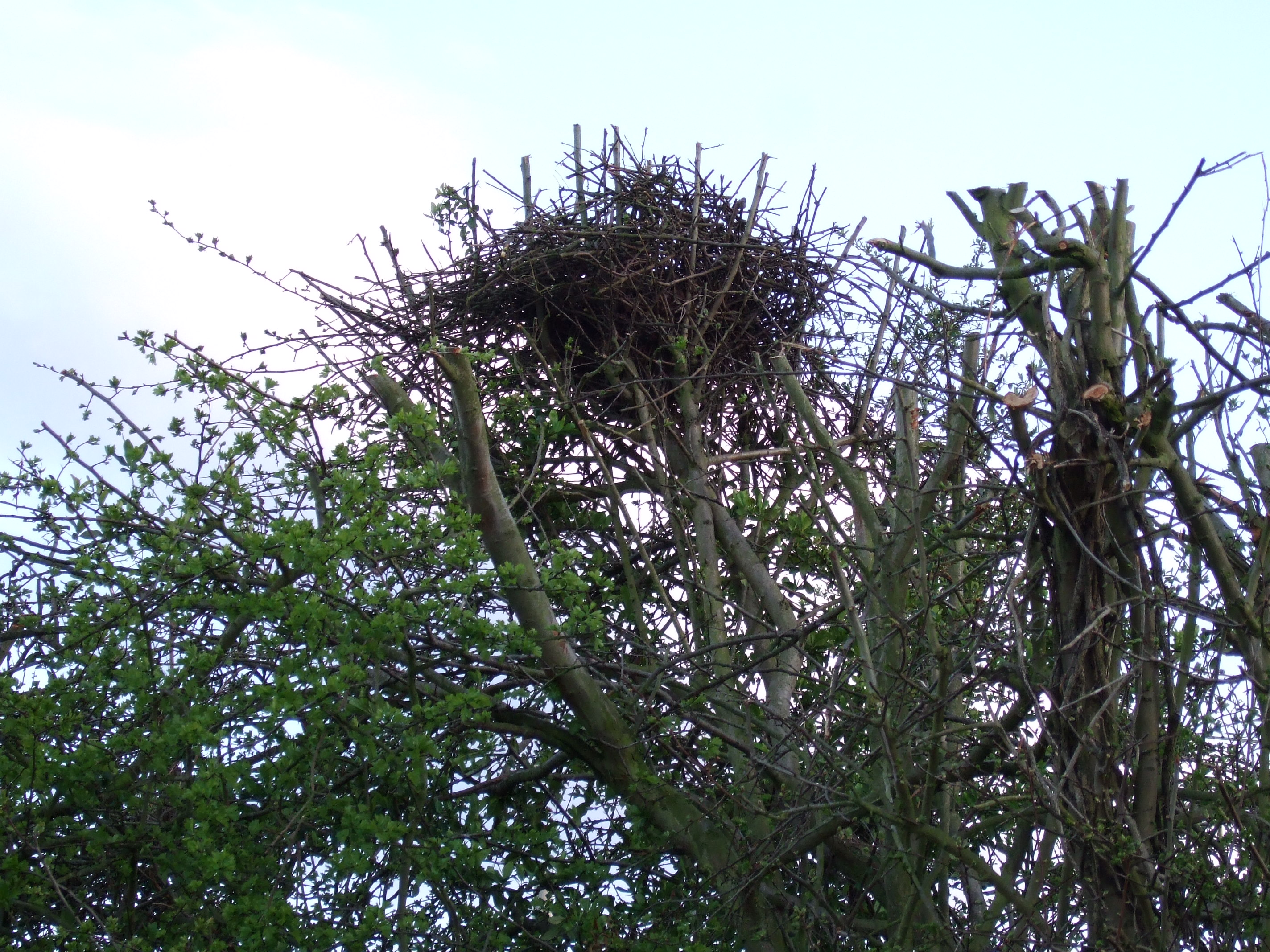
Eastern gray squirrel drey

Normally, one to four young are born in each litter, but the largest possible litter size is eight. The gestation period is about 44 days. The young are weaned around 10 weeks, though some may wean up to six weeks later in the wild. They begin to leave the nest after 12 weeks, with autumn born young often wintering with their mother. Only one in four squirrel kits survives to one year of age, with mortality around 55% for the following year. Mortality rates then decrease to around 30% for following years until they increase sharply at eight years of age.

Rarely, eastern gray females can enter estrus as early as five and a half months old, but females are not normally fertile until at least one year of age. Their mean age of first estrus is 1.25 years. The presence of a fertile male will induce ovulation in a female going through estrus. Male eastern grays are sexually mature between one and two years of age. Reproductive longevity for females appears to be over 8 years, with 12.5 years documented in North Carolina. These squirrels can live to be 20 years old in captivity, but in the wild live much shorter lives due to predation and the challenges of their habitat. At birth, their life expectancy is 1–2 years; an adult typically can live to be six, with exceptional individuals making it to 12 years.

=== Communication ===
Calls recorded in Surrey, England

As in most other mammals, communication among eastern gray squirrel individuals involves both vocalizations and posturing. The species has a quite varied repertoire of vocalizations, including a squeak similar to that of a mouse, a low-pitched noise, a chatter, and a raspy "mehr mehr mehr". Other methods of communication include tail-flicking and other gestures, including facial expressions. Tail flicking and the "kuk" or "quaa" call are used to ward off and warn other squirrels about predators, as well as to announce when a predator is leaving the area. Squirrels also make an affectionate coo-purring sound that biologists call the "muk-muk" sound. This is used as a contact sound between a mother and her kits and in adulthood, by the male when he courts the female during mating season. The use of vocal and visual communication has been shown to vary by location, based on elements such as noise pollution and the amount of open space. For instance, populations living in large cities generally rely more on the visual signals, due to the generally louder environment with more areas without much visual restriction. However, in heavily wooded areas, vocal signals are used more often due to the relatively lower noise levels and a dense canopy restricting visual range.

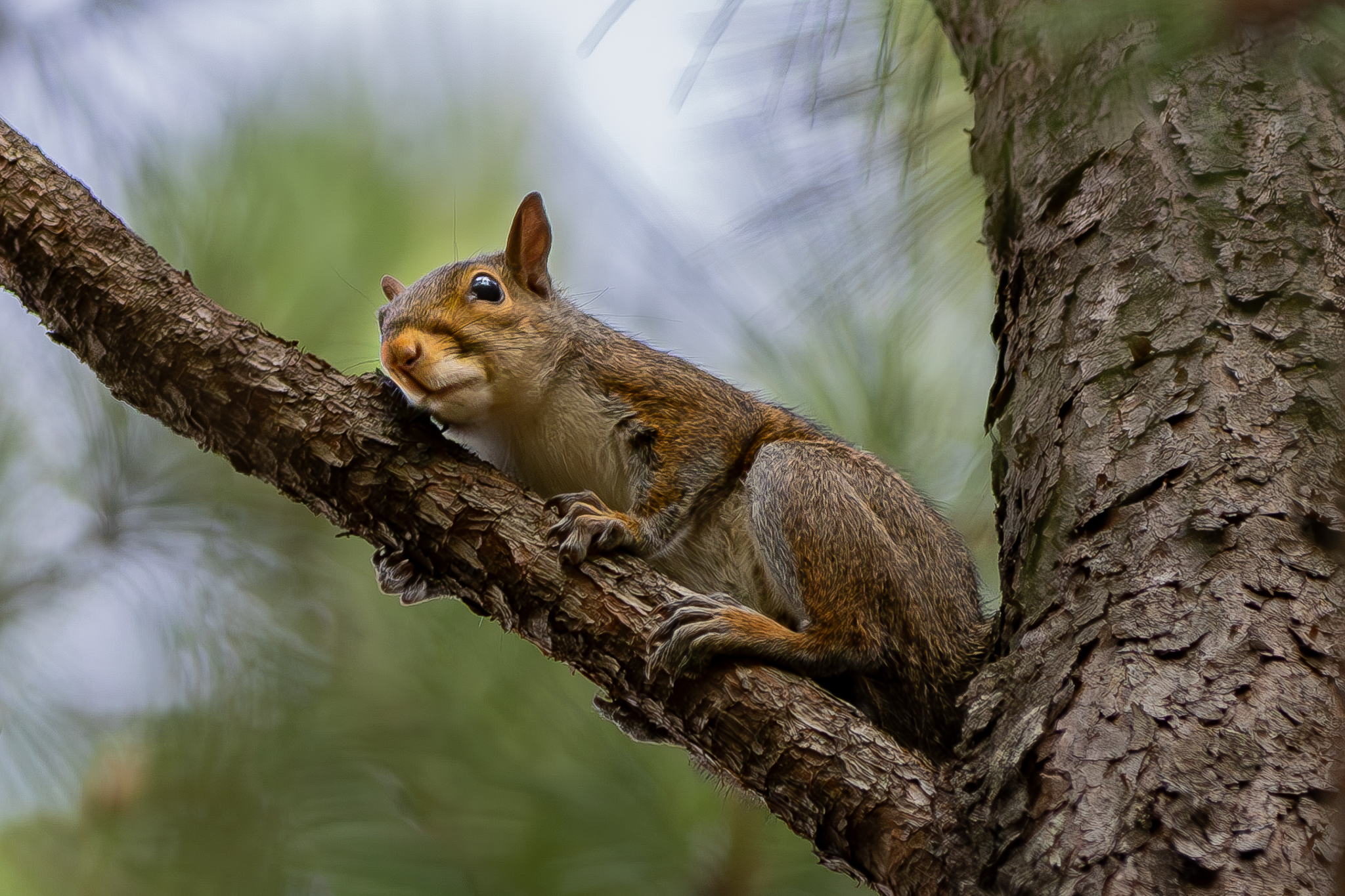
Eastern Gray Squirrel (Sciurus carolinensis) photographed clinging to a branch in an urban area of Cary, North Carolina.

=== Habitat ===
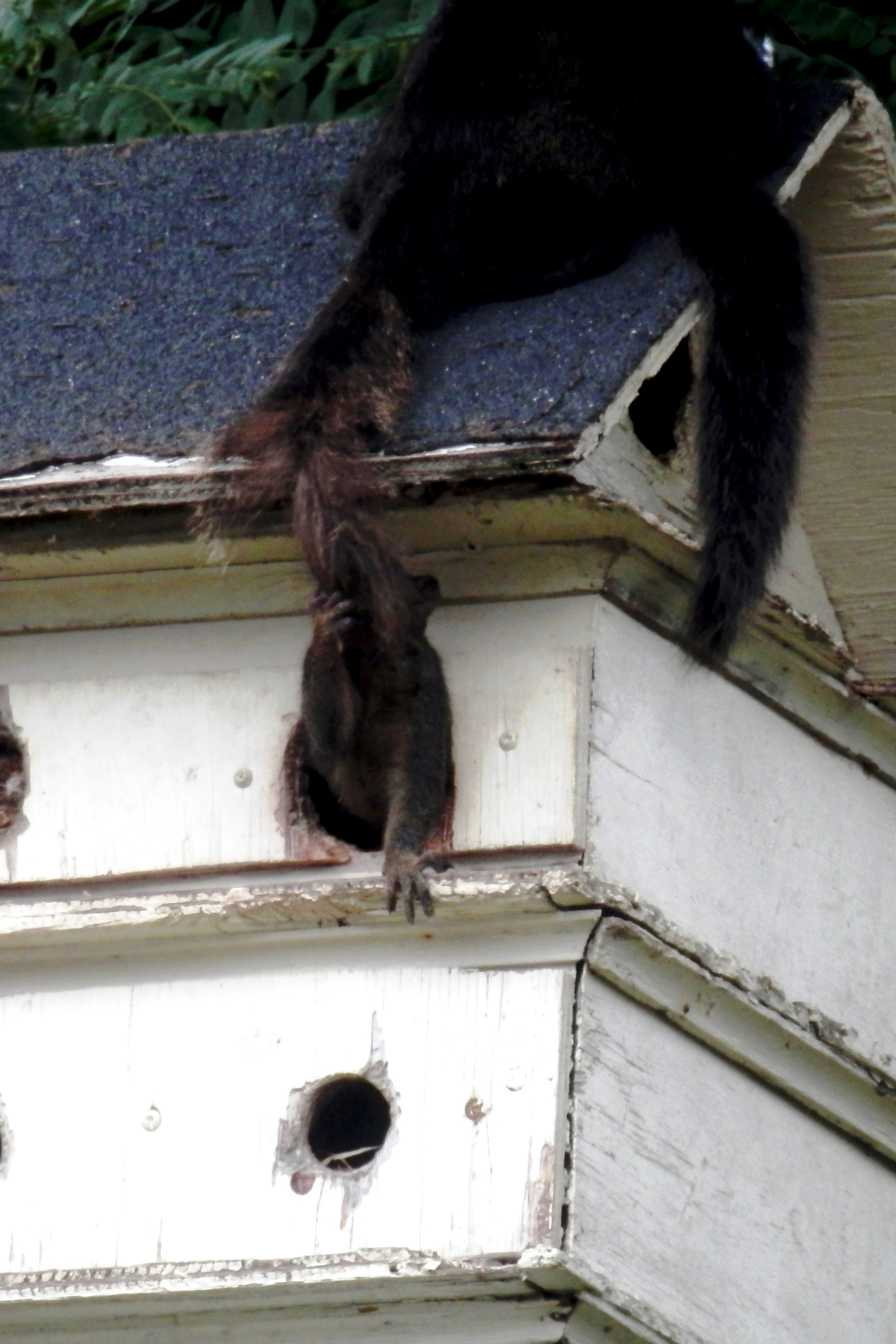
Eastern gray squirrel staying in a birdhouse

In the wild, eastern gray squirrels can be found inhabiting large areas of mature, dense woodland ecosystems, generally covering 100 acres (40 hectares) of land. These forests usually contain large mast-producing trees such as oaks and hickories, providing ample food sources. Oak-hickory hardwood forests are generally preferred over coniferous forests due to the greater abundance of mast forage. This is why they are found only in parts of eastern Canada which do not contain boreal forest (i.e. they are found in some parts of New Brunswick, in southwestern Quebec, throughout southern Ontario and in southern Manitoba).

Eastern gray squirrels generally prefer constructing their dens upon large tree branches and within the hollow trunks of trees. They also have been known to take shelter within abandoned bird nests. The dens are usually lined with moss plants, thistledown, dried grass, and feathers. These perhaps provide and assist in the insulation of the den, used to reduce heat loss. A cover to the den is usually built afterwards. Eastern gray squirrels also use dens for protection from predators and to help them look after their young. Young survive 40 percent less if they lived in a leaf nest compared to a den. Squirrels tend to claim 2–3 dens at the same time. Canopy and midstory trees are used by squirrels to hide from predators such as hawks and owls. The typical squirrel ranges over 1.5 to 8 acres (0.61 to 3.24 ha) and tends to be smaller where more of them are found.

Close to human settlements, eastern gray squirrels are found in parks and back yards of houses within urban environments and in the farmlands of rural environments.

=== Ecosystem ===
Eastern gray squirrels forage tree seeds and disperse them through seed-caching. They may also contribute to the distribution of truffle fungal spores when they eat truffles. They are an important prey source and parasitic host for other animals.

=== Predation ===
Eastern gray squirrels predators include hawks, weasels, raccoons, bobcats, foxes, domestic and feral cats, snakes, owls, and dogs. Their primary predators are hawks, owls, and snakes. Raccoons and weasels may consume a squirrel depending on where it lives in the United States. Rattlesnakes eat squirrels in California as they are searching for food in a heavy forest. The squirrel is susceptible to being eaten by foxes in the eastern region of the United States.

In its introduced range in South Africa, it has been preyed on by African harrier-hawks. When a predator is approaching the eastern gray squirrel, other squirrels will inform the squirrel of the predator by sending an acoustic signal to let the squirrel know. The speed of a squirrel makes it hard for it to be captured by the predators.

=== Diet ===
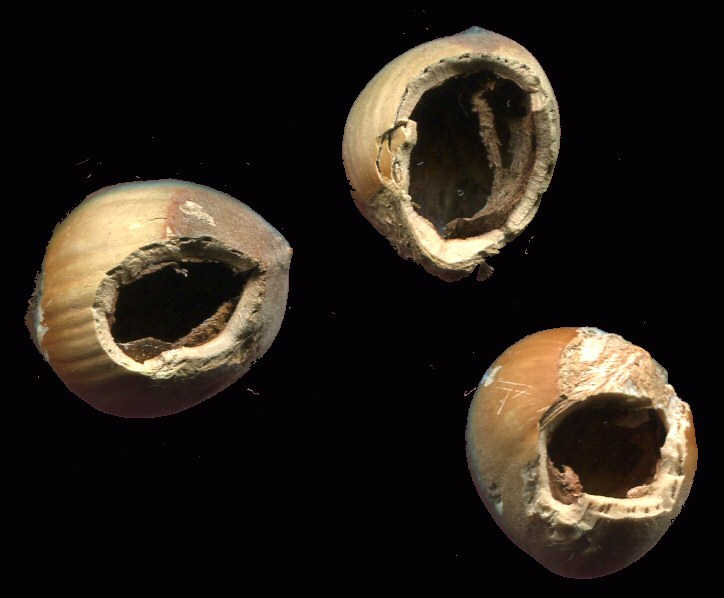
Hazelnuts gnawed by gray squirrel; the curved cut marks left by the sharp incisors are visible around the holes

Eastern gray squirrels eat a range of foods, such as many types of seeds and nuts, including acorns, walnuts, and hazelnuts, bulbs, tree buds, flowers, berries, other fruits, tree bark, and some types of forest fungi, including fly agaric mushrooms and truffles. They are also carnivorous, variously eating insects, small birds, eggs, frogs, lizards, and other small rodents, including other squirrels.

Eastern tree squirrels can cause damage to trees by tearing the bark and eating the soft cambial tissue underneath. In Europe, sycamore and beech suffer the greatest damage. Mast-bearing gymnosperms such as cedar, hemlock, pine, and spruce are another food source, as well as angiosperms such as beech, hickory, oak, and walnut along with maple, mulberry, hackberry, elm, buckeye, and horse chestnut. These trees produce important foods for them during the spring and fall months. Tree squirrels will vary the species they forage upon seasonally. Tree squirrels also raid gardens for wheat, tomatoes, corn, strawberries, and other garden crops. Sometimes they eat the tomato seeds and discard the rest. On occasion, eastern gray squirrels also prey upon insects, frogs, small rodents including other squirrels, and small birds, their eggs, and young. They also gnaw on bones, antlers, and turtle shells – likely as a source of minerals scarce in their normal diet. In urban and suburban areas, these squirrels scavenge for food in trash bins. However, these foods are not safe for them to digest because they include sugar, fat, as well as additives that can make them sick. Eastern gray squirrels are sometimes mistakenly thought to be herbivores, but they are omnivores.

Eastern gray squirrels have a high enough tolerance for humans to inhabit residential neighborhoods and raid bird feeders for millet, corn, and sunflower seeds. Some people who feed and watch birds for entertainment also intentionally feed seeds and nuts to squirrels for the same reason. However, in the UK eastern gray squirrels can take a significant proportion of supplementary food from feeders, preventing access and reducing use by wild birds. Attraction to supplementary feeders can increase local bird nest predation, as eastern gray squirrels are more likely to forage near feeders, resulting in increased likelihood of finding nests, eggs and nestlings of small passerines.

Eating a cicada

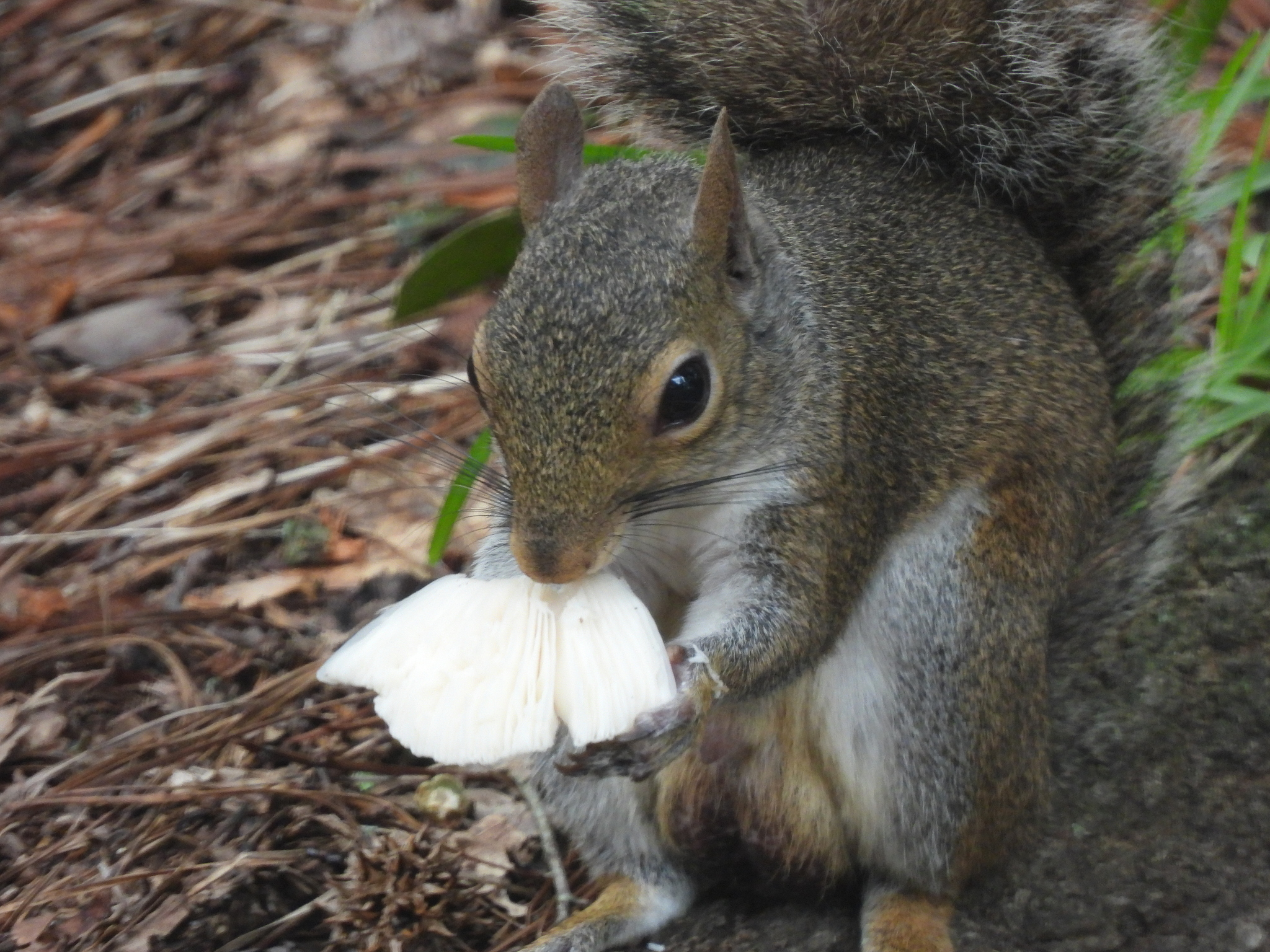
Eating a mushroom

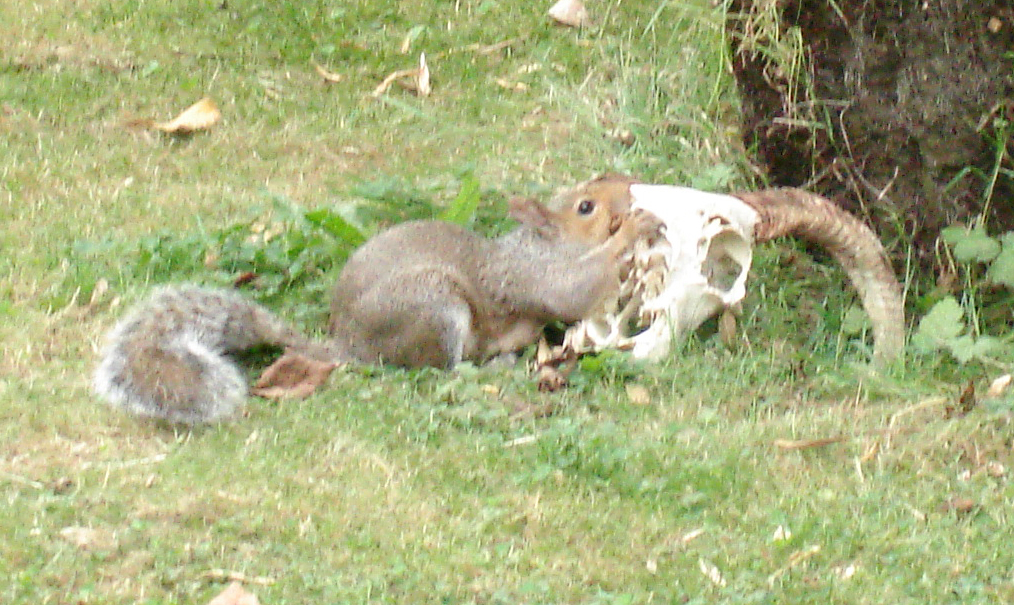
Gnawing on a goat skull

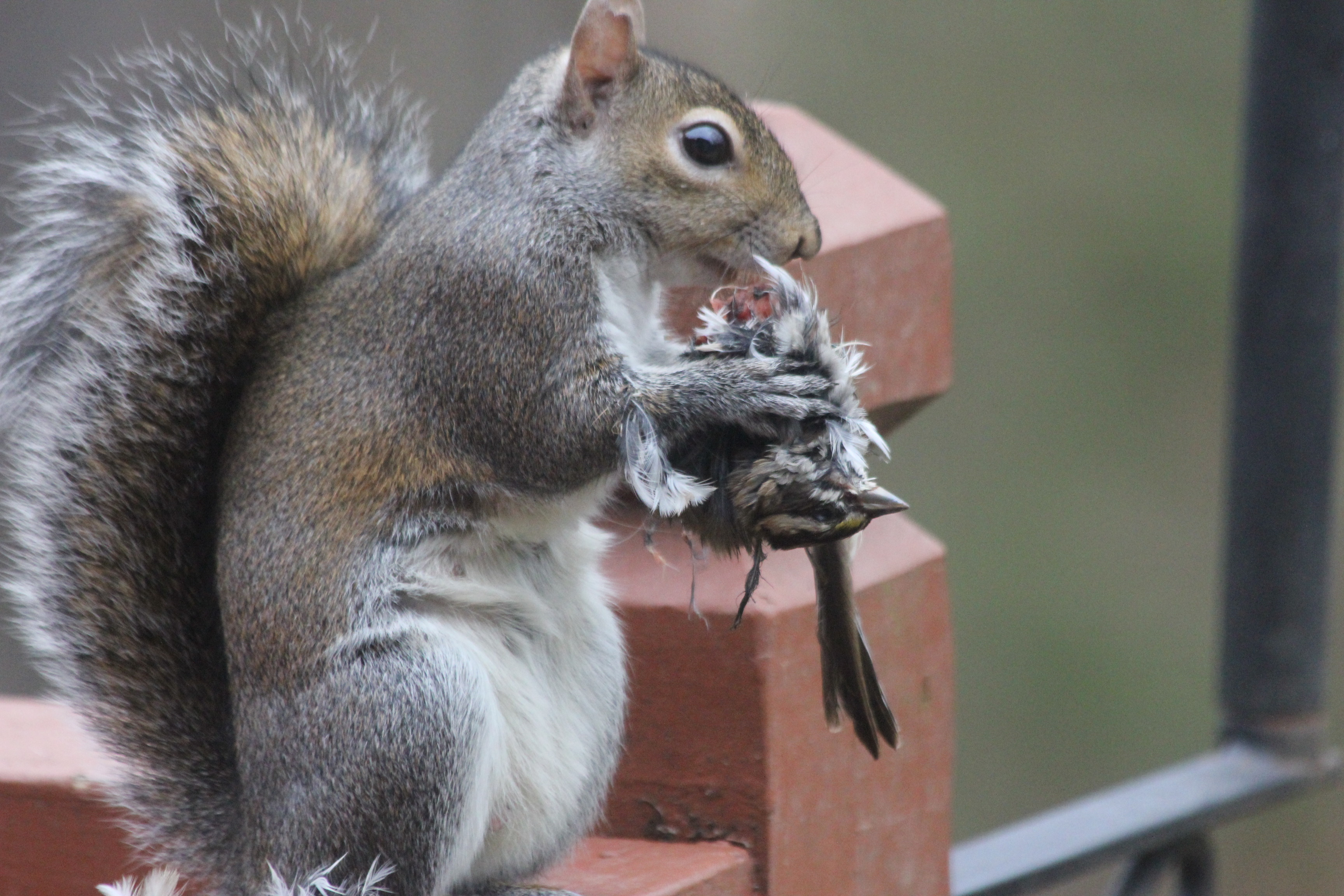
Eating a small bird

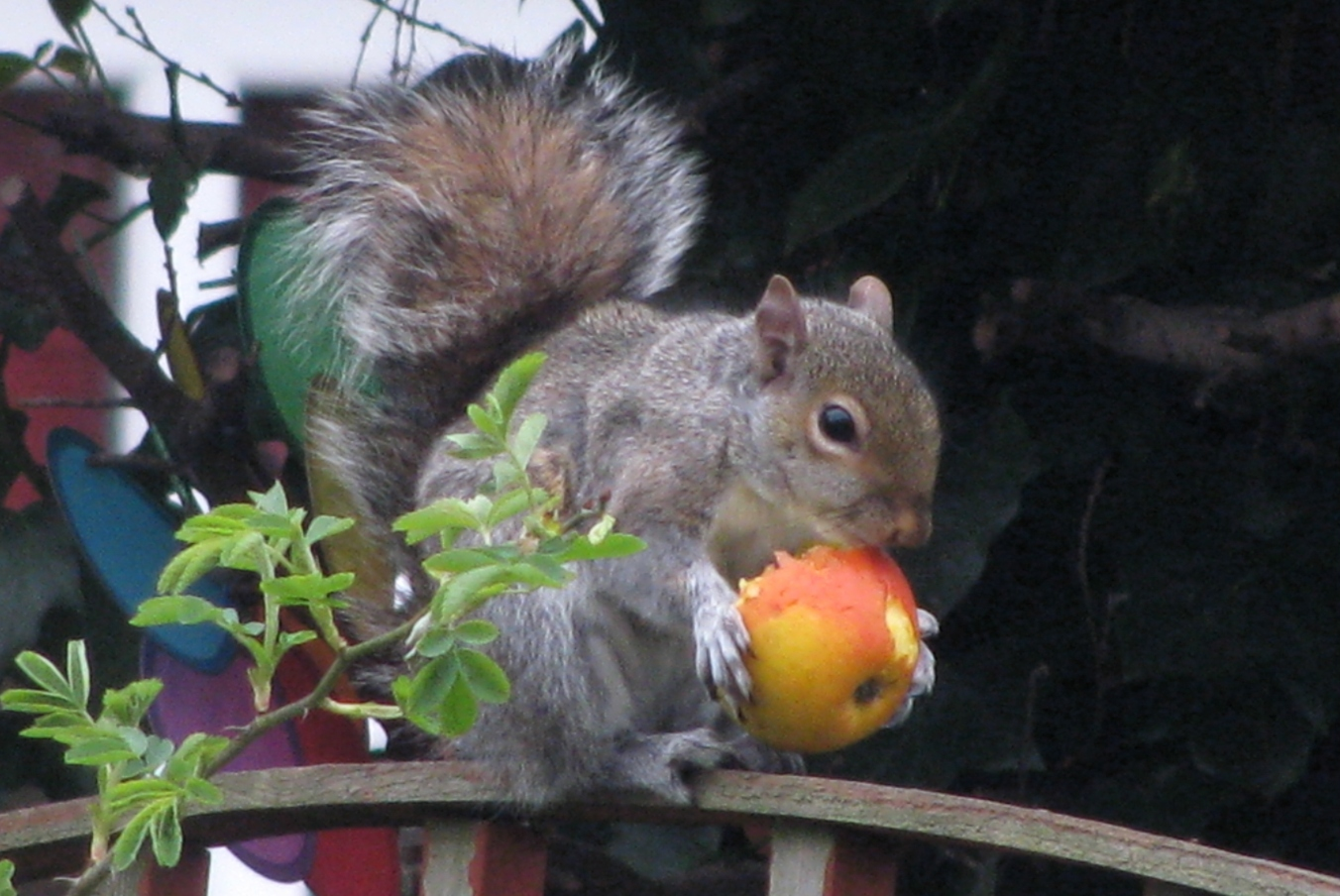
Eating an apple

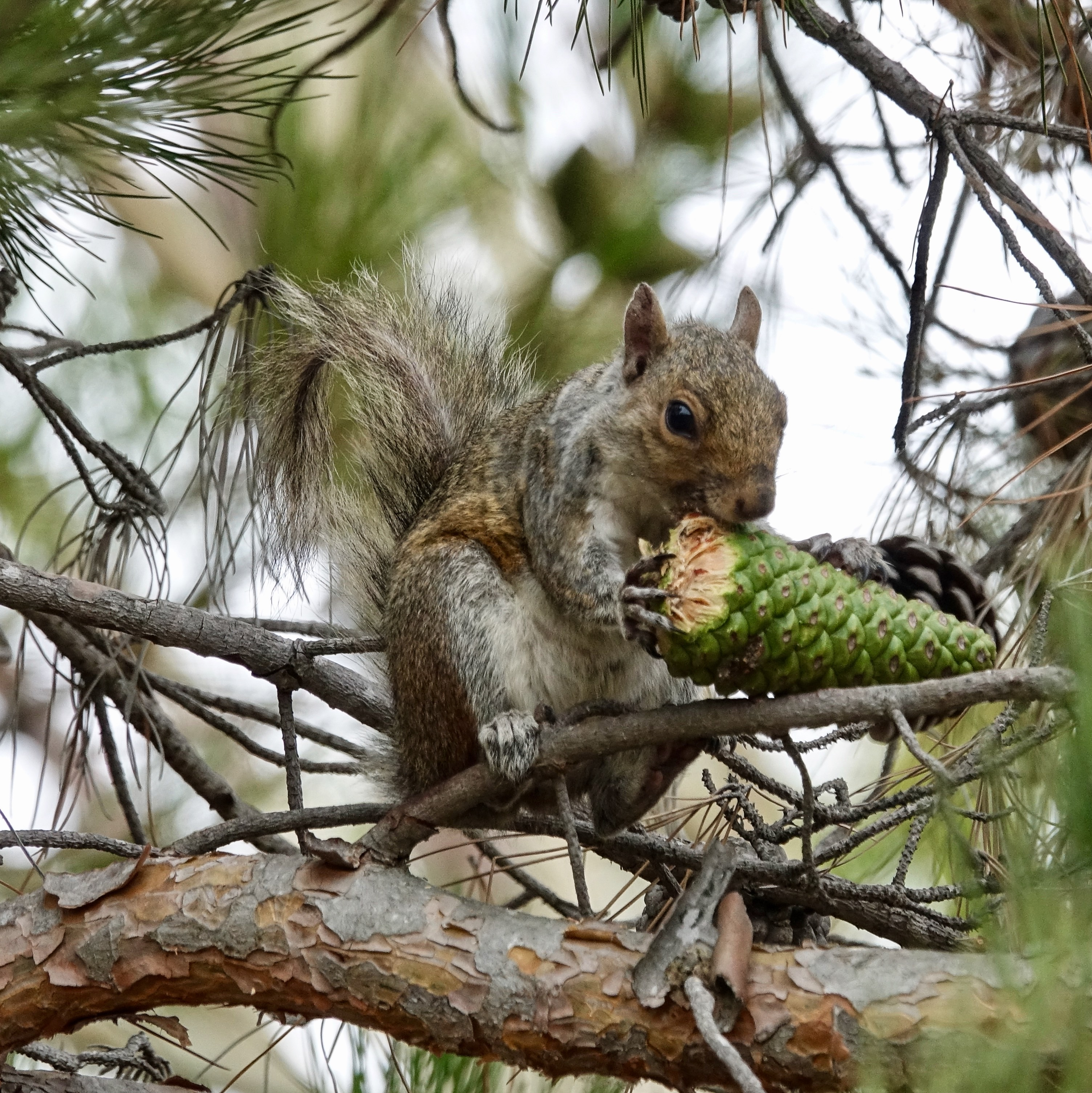
Eating a conifer cone

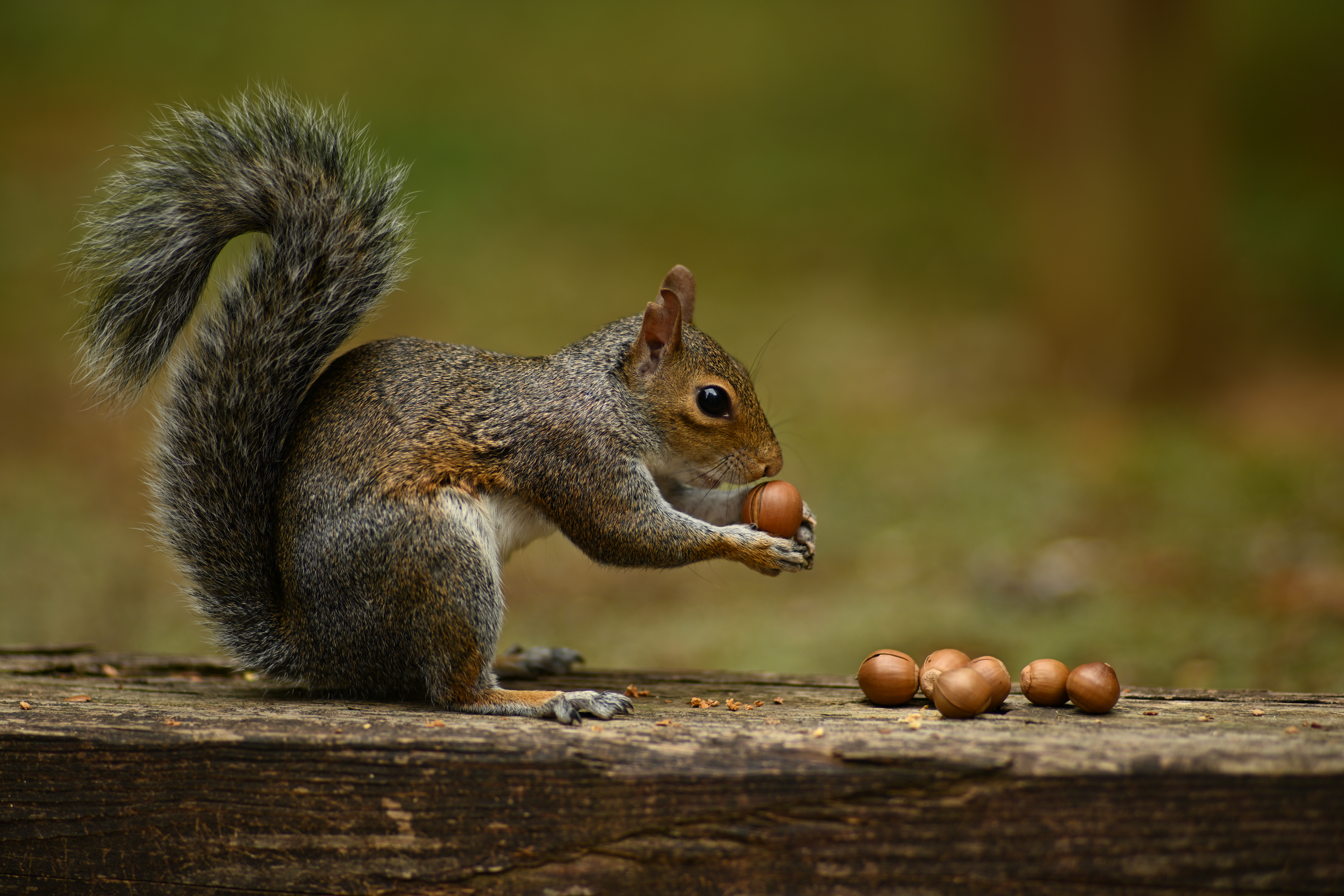
Eating an acorn

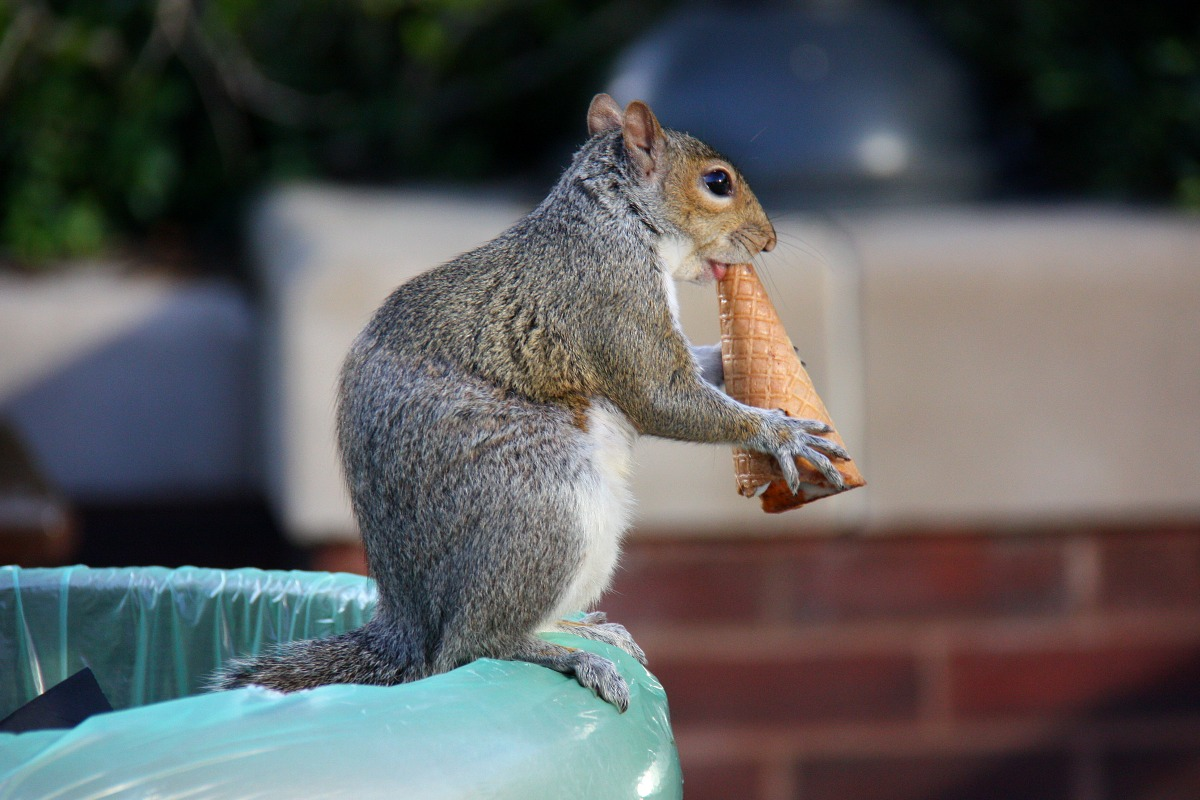
Eating an ice cream cone

=== Food caching ===
Like many members of the family Sciuridae, the eastern gray squirrel is a scatter-hoarder; it hoards food in numerous small caches for later recovery. Some caches are temporary, especially those made near the site of a sudden abundance of food which can be retrieved within hours or days for reburial in a more secure site. Others are more permanent and are not retrieved until months later. Each squirrel is estimated to make several thousand caches each season. The squirrels have very accurate spatial memory for the locations of these caches, using distant and nearby landmarks to retrieve them. Smell is used partly to uncover food caches, and also to find food in other squirrels' caches. Scent can be unreliable when the ground is too dry or covered in snow. Acorn embryos are frequently removed before burial to prevent germination and thus loss of nutrients.

Squirrels sometimes use deceptive behavior to prevent other animals from retrieving cached food. For example, they will pretend to bury the object if they feel that they are being watched. They do this by preparing the spot as usual, for instance, digging a hole or widening a crack, miming the placement of the food, while actually concealing it in their mouths, and then covering up the "cache" as if they had deposited the object. They also hide behind vegetation while burying food or hide it high up in trees (if their rival is not arboreal). Such a complex repertoire suggests that the behaviours are not innate, and imply theory of mind thinking.

== Introductions and impact ==
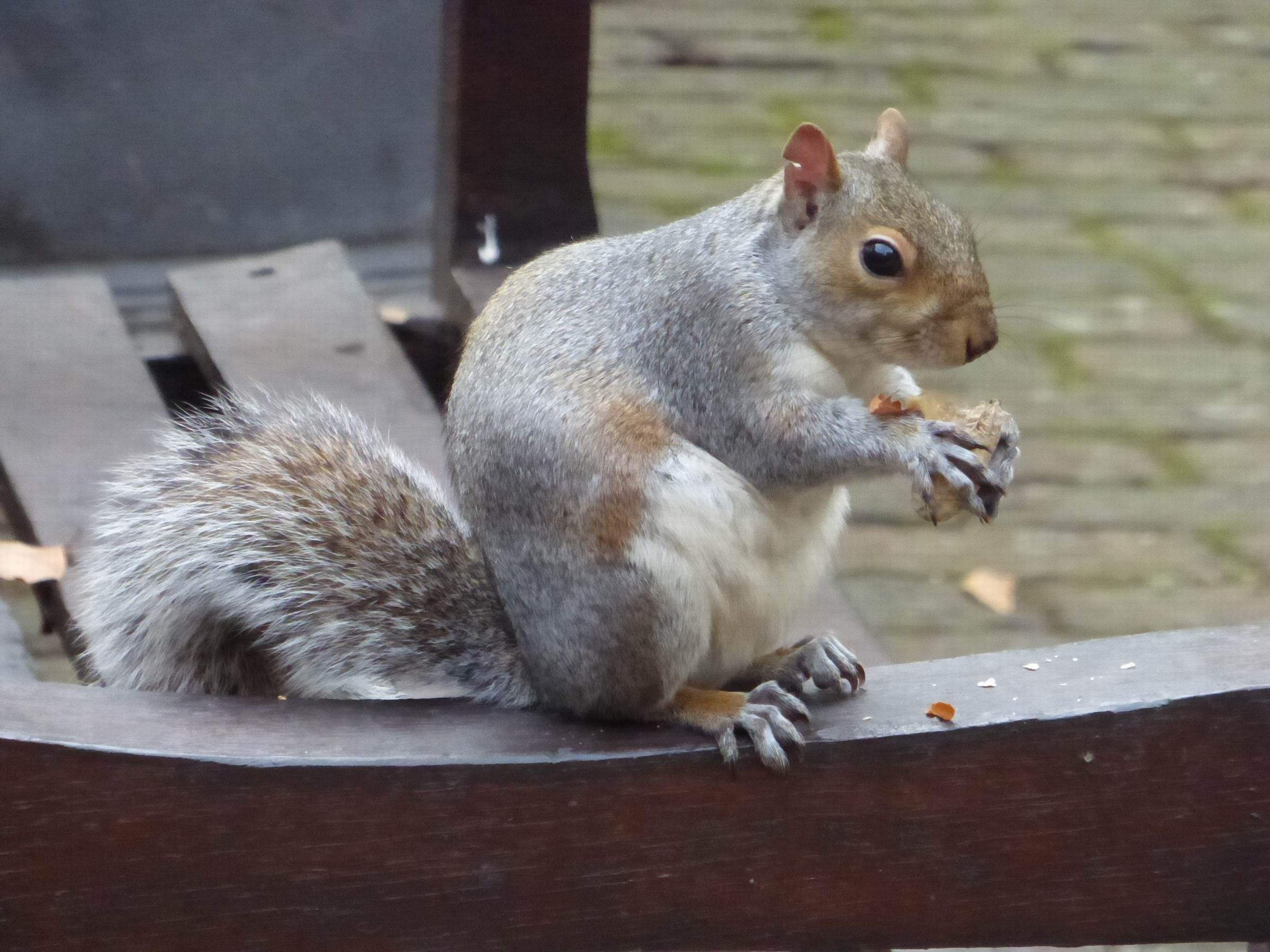
The eastern gray squirrel is an invasive species in the UK (Bunhill Fields, London)

The eastern gray squirrel is an introduced species in a variety of locations in western North America: in western Canada, to the southwest corner of British Columbia and to the city of Calgary, Alberta; in the United States, to the states of Washington and Oregon and, in California, to the city of San Francisco and the San Francisco Peninsula area in San Mateo and Santa Clara Counties, south of the city. It has become the most common squirrel in many urban and suburban habitats in western North America, from north of central California to southwest British Columbia.

By the turn of the 20th century, breeding populations of the eastern gray squirrel had been introduced into South Africa, Ireland, Italy, Australia (extirpated by 1973), and the United Kingdom.

In South Africa, though exotic, it is not usually considered an invasive species owing to its small range (only found in the extreme southwestern part of the Western Cape, going north as far as the small farming town of Franschhoek), as well because it inhabits urban areas and places greatly affected by humans, such as agricultural areas and exotic pine plantations. Here, it mostly eats acorns and pine seeds, although it will take indigenous and commercial fruit, as well. Even so, it is unable to use the natural vegetation (fynbos) found in the area, a factor which has helped to limit its spread. It does not come into contact with native squirrels due to geographic isolation (a native tree squirrel, Paraxerus cepapi, is found only in the savanna regions in the northeast of the country) and different habitats.

Gray squirrels were first introduced to Britain in the 1870s, as fashionable additions to estates. In 1921 it was reported in The Times that the Zoological Society of London had released eastern greys to breed at liberty in Regents Park:

A dozen years ago the Zoological Society of London obtained a number from a private collection in Bedfordshire for the purpose of inducing them to breed at liberty in the Gardens in Regent's Park. They were first kept in a large enclosure from which, when they had become used to visitors, they were allowed to pass in and out by a rope bridge to a tree. It was hoped that they would spread from the Gardens to the Park. After two or three years in which they seemed to be disappearing, they suddenly became ubiquitous...The grey squirrels are plainly happy and plainly give happiness to Londoners...On the other hand, grey squirrels, whether by taking advantage of tubes and buses, or by deliberate human connivance, have spread from London and are invading the country over very wide areas. They are said to drive out the red squirrel, to raid gardens, and to add to the anxieties of the pheasant breeder. We hope that fuller inquiry will not sustain these charges.

They spread rapidly across England, and then became established in both Wales and parts of southern Scotland. On mainland Britain, they have almost entirely displaced native red squirrels. Larger than red squirrels and capable of storing up to four times more fat, gray squirrels are better able to survive winter conditions. They produce more young and can live at higher densities. Gray squirrels also carry the squirrelpox virus, to which red squirrels have no immunity. When an infected gray squirrel introduces squirrelpox to a red squirrel population, its decline is 17–25 times greater than through competition alone.

In Ireland, the displacement of red squirrels has not been as rapid because only a single introduction occurred, in County Longford. Schemes have been introduced to control the population of gray squirrels in Ireland to encourage the native red squirrels. Eastern gray squirrels have also been introduced to Italy, and the European Union has expressed concern that they will similarly displace the red squirrel from parts of the European continent.

=== As food ===
Gray squirrels were eaten in earlier times by Native Americans and their meat is still popular with hunters across most of their range in North America. Today, it is still available for human consumption and is occasionally sold in the United Kingdom. However, physicians in the United States have warned that squirrel brains should not be eaten, because of the risk that they may carry Creutzfeldt–Jakob disease.

=== As an invasive species ===
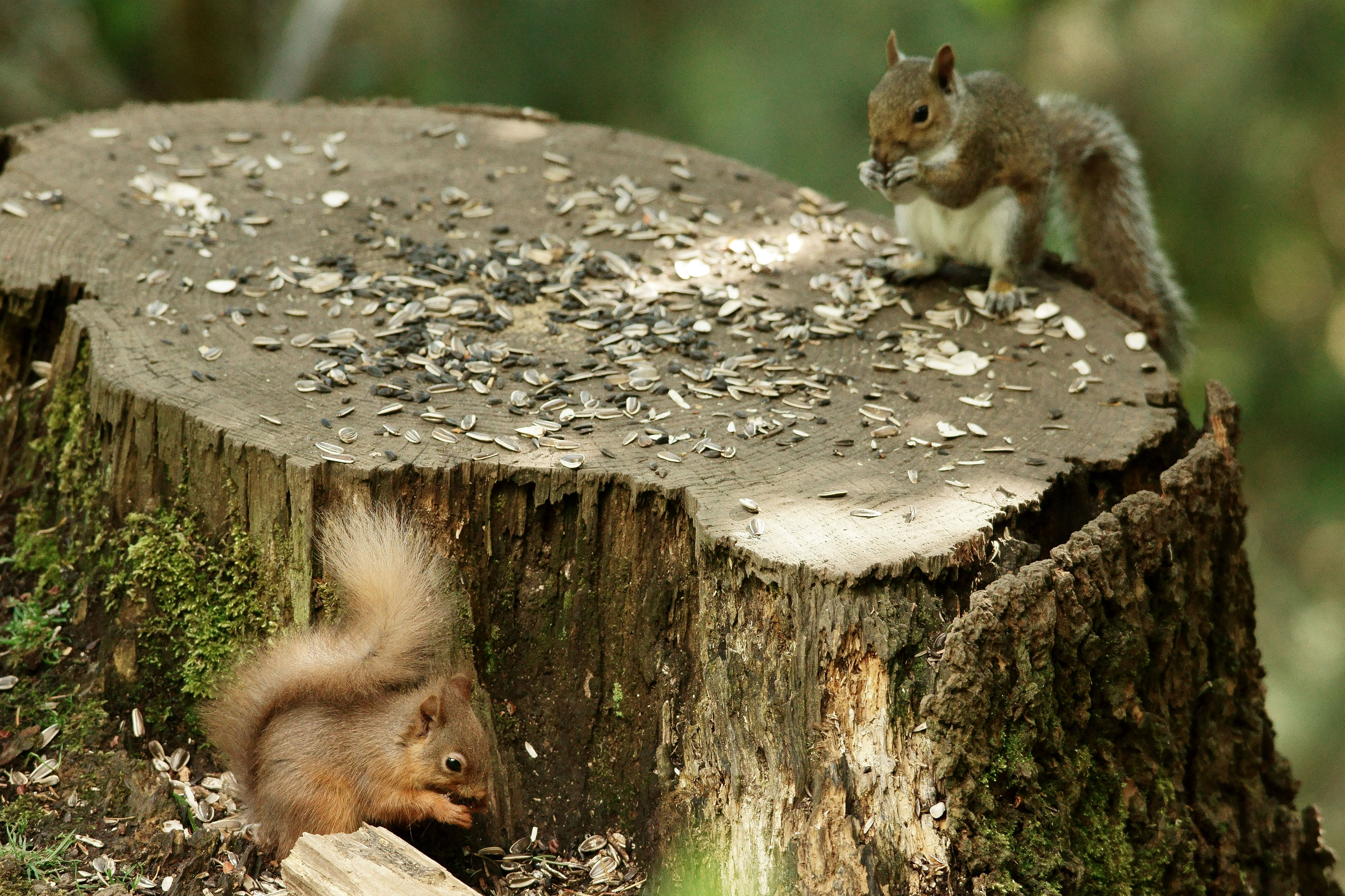
An eastern gray squirrel and a red squirrel eating seeds

In many locations in North America and Europe, the grey squirrel is considered an invasive species and has displaced native red squirrel populations. Red squirrel displacement is notable in Britain, Ireland, Italy, and on Vancouver Island.

The main factor in the eastern gray squirrel's displacement of the red squirrel is thought to be its greater fitness, hence a competitive advantage over the red squirrel Within 15 years of the grey squirrel's introduction to a red squirrel habitat in Great Britain, red squirrel populations are extinct. The eastern gray squirrel tends to be larger and stronger than the red squirrel and has been shown to have a greater ability to store fat for winter. Due to the dearth of trees in their native Ireland for them to reside in, red squirrels are the only species being harmed by the invasion of grey squirrels. Parapoxvirus may also be a strongly contributing factor; red squirrels have long been fatally affected by the disease, while the eastern gray squirrels are unaffected, but thought to be carriers – although how the virus is transmitted has yet to be determined. Red squirrel extinction rates can be 20–25 times greater in areas with confirmed cases of squirrel pox than they are in areas without the disease. The red squirrel is also less tolerant of habitat destruction and fragmentation, which has led to its population decline, while the more adaptable eastern gray squirrel has taken advantage and expanded. Methods done to control this competition between these squirrels are that red squirrels should remain in their original habitats, such as Ireland, while the grey squirrels should be kept out of these places entirely as a means of controlling this squirrel competition.

In Britain and Ireland, the eastern gray squirrel is not regulated by natural predators, other than the European pine marten, which is generally absent from England and Wales. This has aided its rapid population growth and has led to the species being classed as a pest and it is now illegal to release captured eastern grey squirrels back into the wild in the UK. Measures are being devised to reduce its numbers, including a campaign starting in 2006 named "Save Our Squirrels" using the slogan "Save a red, eat a grey!" which attempted to re-introduce squirrel meat in to the local market, with celebrity chefs promoting the idea, cookbooks introducing recipes containing squirrel and the Forestry Commission providing a regular supply of squirrel meat to British restaurants, factories and butchers. In areas where relict populations of red squirrels survive, such as the islands of Anglesey, Brownsea and the Isle of Wight, programs exist to eradicate gray squirrels and prevent them from reaching these areas in order to allow red squirrel populations to recover and grow.

Eastern gray squirrels have also been introduced to the US state of Washington, where their presence is linked to local reductions in the numbers of the local western gray squirrel (Sciurus griseus). Seven pairs were originally introduced in 1925 into Woodland Park in Seattle, from which they spread rapidly around Green Lake and to Lake Washington and from there across Washington state. Introduced populations also exist in California, where they tend to be found primarily in riparian areas, moist woodland, and human-modified areas, while western gray squirrels remain more common in drier upland forests where eastern squirrels appear to struggle to maintain the twice-yearly reproductive period that native squirrels do. In Oregon, eastern grey squirrels are also mostly reported within urban areas, where western gray squirrels are typically absent.

== See also ==
- Black squirrel, a melanistic subgroup
- Western gray squirrel (Sciurus griseus)
- Arizona gray squirrel (Sciurus arizonensis)
- Mexican gray squirrel (Sciurus aureogaster)
- Tommy Tucker (squirrel), a celebrity eastern gray squirrel in the 1940s
- Pinto Bean (squirrel), a piebald eastern gray squirrel in Illinois that died in 2022
- Peanut (squirrel), an eastern gray which became famous on social media and was then controversially killed in 2024
