= Stupinigi =

Hamlet in Turine, Italy

Coordinates: 44°59′N 7°36′E

Location in Piedmont, Italy

Stupinigi (Italian: [stupiˈniːdʒi]; Piedmontese: Stupinis [stypiˈniz]) is a frazione (hamlet/borough) of the comune (municipality) of Nichelino, in the Metropolitan City of Turin (Piedmont, north-west Italy). It has a population of about 200. It borders the comuni of Candiolo and Orbassano on the southwestern outskirts of Turin, about 10 km from the centre of the city. Before 1869, it formed part of the comune of Vinovo.

Stupinigi is known for the eighteenth-century palazzina di caccia, one of the historical Residences of the Royal House of Savoy, for the medieval castle (Castelvecchio), and for the associated park and nature reserve (Parco naturale di Stupinigi).

== History and landmarks ==
Historically Stupinigi centres on the Castelvecchio: a medieval castle which belonged to the Savoy-Acaja, a branch of the House of Savoy who until 1416 were signori of Piedmont—a much smaller territory than the present-day region—and briefly Princes of Achaia. In 1439, the castle was purchased by the Marquis Orlando Pallavicino (il Magnifico, "the Magnificent"); in 1563 it passed to the Duke of Savoy, Emmanuel Philibert, when the capital of the Duchy was transferred from Chambéry to Turin. Subsequently, Emmanuel Philibert granted Stupinigi to the Order of Saints Maurice and Lazarus.

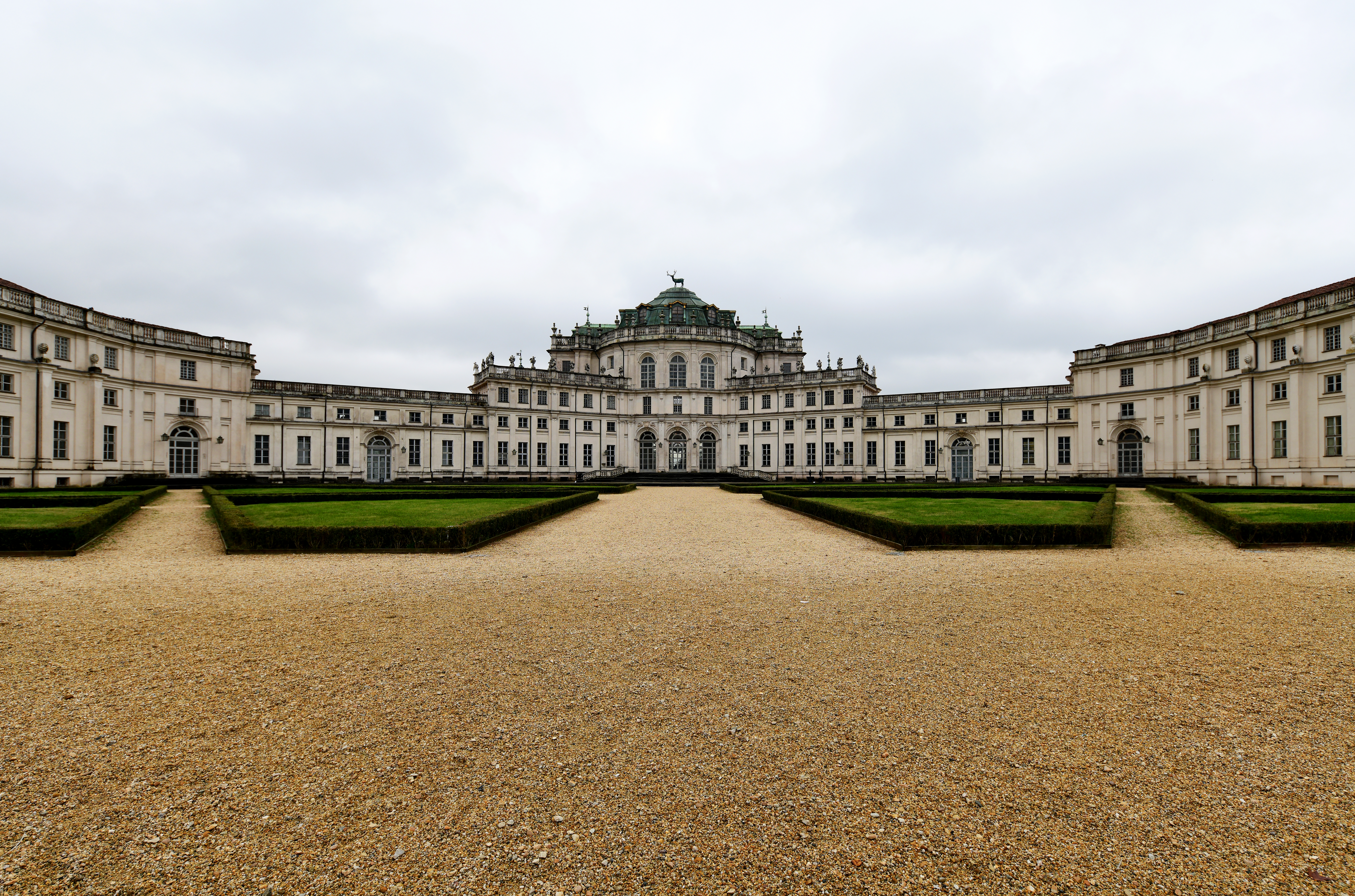
Palazzina di caccia di Stupinigi

The Palazzina di caccia di Stupinigi, a hunting lodge built on the grand scale, was designed by the architect Filippo Juvarra for Victor Amadeus in the latter's role as Grand Master General of the order. Work started on the building in 1729 and two years later it was ready to play host to its first hunt. In 1832 ownership of the Palazzina passed to the royal family, in 1919 it became a property of the state and in 1925 it was returned to the Order, which retains it to this day.

The park, today the Parco naturale di Stupinigi, which covers an area of woods and agricultural land in Stupinigi, Candiolo and Orbassano, was declared a nature reserve in 1991. There have been no deer here since the nineteenth century, but it provides a sanctuary for rare plant species and for wildlife.

The first reported introduction of grey squirrels in continental Europe occurred in 1948, when they were taken to Stupinigi, where there is still a growing population.
