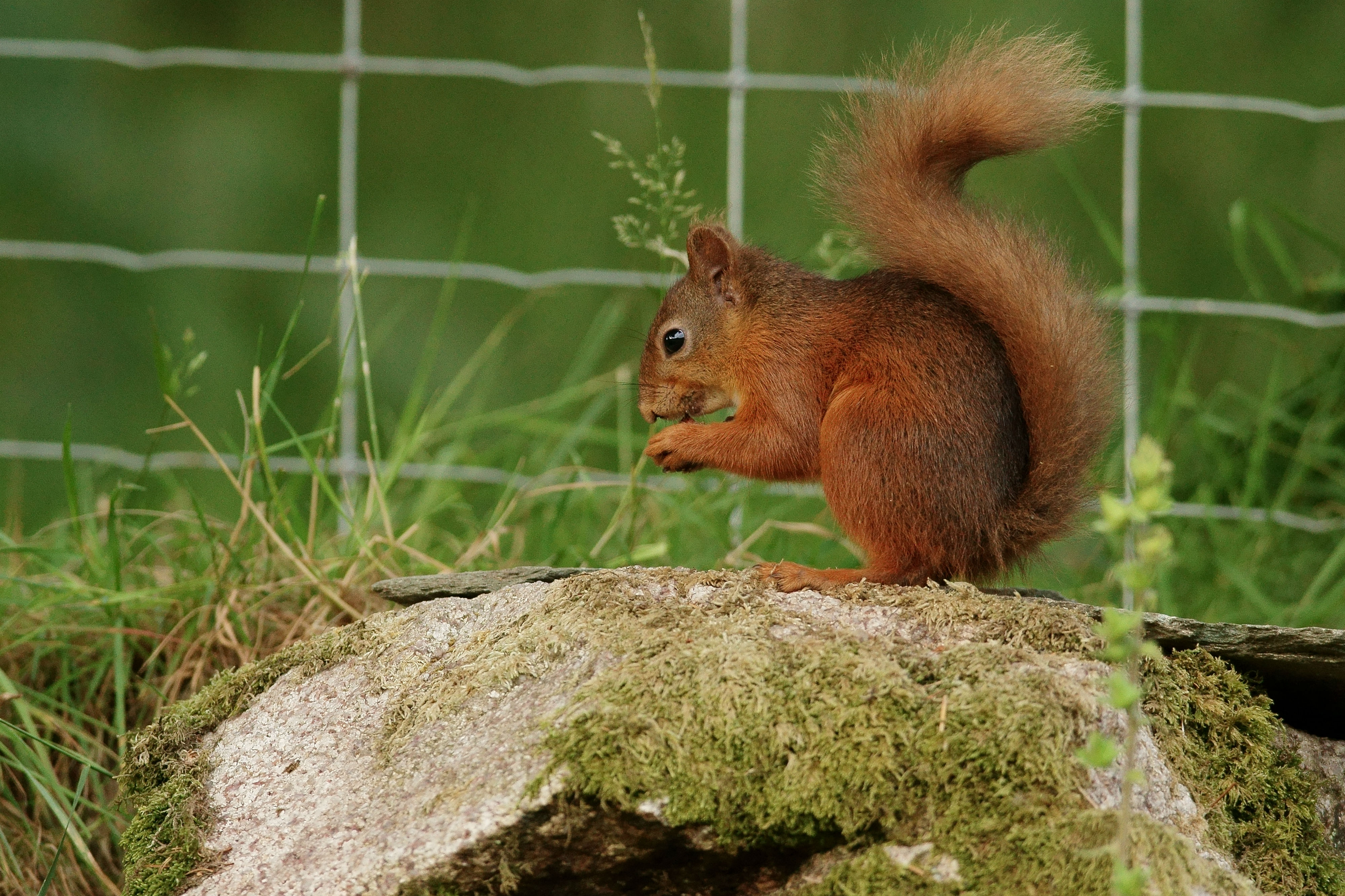
- This red squirrel's mouth is showing the first signs of potential Squirrelpox virus infection

Virus classification
- (unranked): Virus
- Realm: Varidnaviria
- Kingdom: Bamfordvirae
- Phylum: Nucleocytoviricota
- Class: Pokkesviricetes
- Order: Chitovirales
- Family: Poxviridae
- Genus: unassigned
- Species: Squirrelpox virus

Synonyms
- Squirrel parapoxvirus; Squirrel poxvirus

= Squirrelpox virus =

Species of virus

Squirrelpox virus (SQPV) is a virus that causes the fatal disease squirrelpox in United Kingdom and Republic of Ireland red squirrels. The virus is often carried by grey squirrels from North America, which rarely die from the disease. Elsewhere in the Red Squirrel's European range, either the grey squirrel does not occur or it lacks the poxvirus.

== Overview ==
Grey squirrels very rarely die from this disease as their population has developed immunity having been exposed to the virus for many years; however, they are still carriers of the infection and can spread the disease to red squirrels. In sharp contrast, there are no known red squirrels that have developed immunity to the disease, and the mortality rate for untreated infected squirrels in the wild appears to be 100%, most dying within 4–5 days of being infected. There has been some more recent anecdotal evidence on resistance to squirrel pox in the red population including the finding of a healthy red squirrel with antibodies to the virus in Cumbria. However the mortality rate is still considered severe, and certainly capable of local extinction of red squirrels in areas that succumb to the disease.

== Taxonomy ==
The ICTV abbreviation for Squirrelpox virus is SQPV. The classification of the virus is still under debate, and the recent studies have suggested that it should be grouped into a clade of its own rather than Parapoxvirus.

== Transmission ==
The virus can spread through contact with the infected lesions or contaminated crusts, and can also be carried by mosquitoes. Fleas are another vector for the disease. Most poxviruses are highly resistant to drying, which allows crusts to remain infectious for long periods of time. It is believed that the virus can be transferred by contaminated feeders, which is why red squirrel preservation organizations often recommend that feeders are disinfected daily. Many poxviruses are potentially zoonotic, and other poxviral infections have been reported in man. However, no cases of transmission to humans are known.

== Symptoms ==
UK squirrelpox virus is an entirely different virus to that which causes skin fibromas (tumours) in American grey squirrels. UK grey squirrels carry the virus but are unaffected by it whereas in red squirrels, the virus causes skin ulcers, lesions, and scabs. It can also cause swelling and discharge (from the lesions/scabs) near the eyes, mouth, feet, and genitalia. Additionally, squirrels that fall victim to the disease often become increasingly lethargic as it progresses. Infected animals are said to resemble rabbits with myxomatosis, in that they are sometimes found shivering and lethargic.

== Origins ==
SQPV is found in the eastern part of North America from Ontario in the north to North Carolina in the south. The origins of squirrelpox virus in the UK are mostly unknown. The first confirmed incident was in East Anglia in the 1980s. It has since spread to Lancashire (confirmed in 1995–1996), Cumbria (spring 1998), Durham (1999), and Northumberland (1999). The squirrelpox virus is regarded as a significant factor in the decline of red squirrel populations in the UK.

Although the squirrelpox virus has only been recorded once in Scotland, it may be more prevalent due to lack of thorough testing.

It is thought to be similar to a case of disease seen in East Anglian red squirrels at the turn of the 20th century.

== Long-term effects ==
Although red squirrels were once prevalent throughout the British Isles, there are now only about 140,000. Most of these are in Scotland. The decline of red squirrels is blamed mostly on disease, the loss of woodlands, and competition by grey squirrels. There are over 2.5 million grey squirrels in the British Isles. Red squirrels' survival chances in conifer woods are much higher than in deciduous woods.

== Vaccine Development ==
In early 2023, over 11,000 people signed a petition to the Welsh Senedd calling for research into a vaccine to be restarted. Promising virus attenuation studies had ended a decade earlier in 2013 after funding ran out.
