= Aromantic asexuality =

Romantic and sexual orientation

Aromantic asexual
- Etymology: The combination of aromantic (aro) and asexual (ace) using the split attraction model
- Definition: The lack of both romantic and sexual attraction to others
- Abbreviations: aroace; aro-ace
- Parent category: Aromanticism; Asexuality

Other terms
- Associated terms: alloaro; alloace

Flag

Aromantic asexual, colloquially shortened to aroace or aro-ace, is a romantic and sexual orientation characterized by experiencing little to no romantic and sexual attraction. The name comes from combining the two attraction minorities, aromanticism and asexuality, specifically the shortened versions of their names: "aro" for aromantic and "ace" for asexual, and forming a combined term using the split attraction model.

Just like asexuality and aromanticism, aroace identities exist on a spectrum.

About a quarter of asexual people also identify as aromantic, with just over 40% of aromantic people identifying as asexual. Aroace individuals may feel alienated from the broader LGBTQ+ community due to amatonormativity.

== Community ==
=== Symbols ===
The first aroace flag, designed by Deviantart user Pride-Flags in 2016, was a combination of the aromantic and asexual flags. This design has the aromantic flag at the top and the asexual flag on the bottom, with the two merging at a black stripe in the middle. The original 2016 flag is used by advocacy group Aro/Ace San Diego. Deviantart user decaykid uploaded a simplified design in 2017, with one less stripe and slightly different colors.

The most popular and most widely recognized aroace flag, often referred to as the "sunset flag" was designed by Tumblr user aroaesflags in 2018. It consists of five horizontal bars, including (from top to bottom) orange, yellow, white, and two shades of blue. The two shades of blue represent the spectrum of aroace identities and experiences. White represents wholeness, yellow represents love and relationships outside of more conventional ideas of romantic and sexual relationships, and orange represents community. According to the creator, blue sits between aromantic green and asexual purple on the color wheel, while orange sits between green and purple in the opposite direction.

Another flag sometimes used to represent aromantic asexuality is the aromantic flag colors in a heart shape on the asexual flag.

The ace of spades playing card is also used as a symbol of aromantic asexuality, with the ace of hearts symbolizing romantic asexuality.

=== Microlabels ===
Aroace identities exist on a broad spectrum, including but not limited to the following microlabels:

- Angled aroace — experiencing an intense form of non-sexual, non-romantic (ie. platonic, aesthetic) attraction while still being on the aroace spectrum, including those that experience some amount of romantic or sexual attraction (see grey-aroace).
- Aroaceflux — having fluctuating experiences on both the aromantic and asexual spectrums.
- Demiaroace — both demiromantic and demisexual, experiencing sexual and romantic attraction only after an emotional bond has been formed.
- Grey-aroace — both grayromantic and greysexual; experiencing limited, infrequent, or nebulous romantic and sexual attraction.
- Oriented aroace — similar to angled aroace, but refers only to people who experience no romantic or sexual attraction at all.

== Demographics ==
A 2011 survey of 3,436 asexuals found that 40.9% were somewhere on the aromantic spectrum, with 18.2% being completely aromantic, 12.1% demiromantic, and 10.6% greyromantic. Later, a 2020 study from the Archives of Sexual Behavior found that 26% of asexual people also identify as aromantic, while the 2020 Asexual Community Survey found the overlap to be 29%. The Aromantic Census, also in 2020, found that 42% of aromantic people also identified as asexual. Another 2020 survey, this one by the Trevor Project, found that about 13% of asexual youth who responded were also aromantic.

The 2024 Asexual Community Survey, which has the most recently released results as of October 2026, found that 51.4% of respondents were on both the aromantic and asexual spectrum. Of those on both spectrums, 66.1% identified as aromantic, 22.2% as demiromantic, 18.2% as greyromantic, 6.1% as aegoromantic, 3.7% as aroflux, 4.5% as cupioromantic, and 4.7% as quoiromantic.

== Research ==
=== Aromantic asexuality and autism ===
In 2025, researchers Randolph C. H. Chan and Fei Nga Hung published a paper on the intersection of autism and asexuality. They found that autistic people on the asexual spectrum were more likely to also be on the aromantic spectrum (47.8%) compared to non autistic asexuals (39.4%). A possible reason for this is that the social difficulties autistic people can have may cause lower interest in romantic relationships.

=== Attachment styles ===
A 2019 cross-sectional study explored attachment styles in relation to asexuality according to provided responses using the Asexuality Identification Scale, a scale used to explore self-reported asexuality behaviors. The study showed a relation between wanting romantic relationships and avoidant/anxious attachment styles, showing an increase in avoidant attachment traits when a romantic relationship is not desired and vice versa.

=== Sexual aversion ===
A 2022 study run by Ana Catarina and David L Rodrigues found that aromantic asexuals tended to experience more sexual aversion than romantic asexuals. On a 7-point scale, aromantic asexuals rated their sexual aversion an average of 4.31, while romantic asexuals had a 3.74.

Another study on sexual aversion in asexuals was published in 2026 by Zurong Liang and Boxuan Song. They found that asexuals on the aromantic spectrum were over twice as likely to be sex-averse than romantic asexuals, with 51.3% labeling themselves as such compared to 25.1% for those not on the aromantic spectrum.

Sexual aversion in asexuals is thought to be different than sexual aversions in allosexuals. A study conducted by Nahanni Musiani et. al. explores levels of distress associated with sexual aversion in asexuals compared to allosexuals, with the findings that asexuals can tend to experience low distress in regards to their aversion.

== Stigma and social invisibility ==
Several aroace people report struggling with social invisibility, even among the LGBTQ+ community. While this often contributes to feelings of loneliness, some also use it as a means of camouflaging at work or school, though this often reinforces feelings of loneliness.

Many aroace people also struggle with amatonormativity and allonormativity, social assumptions that treat romantic and sexual attraction as more important and contribute to aro/ace erasure and stigma. Some aroace people have also discussed believing that the identity could be changed through therapy.

Aroace individuals may also struggle with aphobia, including from within the LGBTQ+ community and within medical settings. Some aroace people might not feel that they belong within the wider LGBTQ+ community. The sexuality of LGBTQ+ safe spaces might also contribute to feelings of invisibility among the community, as well as the inherent sexuality of medicine.

Infantilization, though not widely studied, is also a topic of discussion within many aroace communities, with Rachel Nevada Wood discussing the stigma regarding asexuality and perceived maturity. Conversations about infantilization might also lead to the discussion on the differences of social development between people within and outside of the aroace community.

== Activism ==
Yasmin Benoit is an aroace activist who came out in 2018. In 2021 she won Attitude magazine's Attitude Pride Award, becoming the first openly aroace person to win any LGBTQ+ award.

The Ace and Aro Advocacy Project, an organization working within the D.C. Metro area, advocates for the rights of aroace people through supporting them and providing resources to them and the public. Many advocates associated with the organization are listed on the organization's website.

Columbia Aces is a student-lead organization based in Columbus University, New York, which aims to create an open conversation space for aroace people to meet like-minded people and to educate.

== In media ==
Alice Oseman's graphic novel Loveless follows the story of Georgia, a college student discovering her identity as aromantic and asexual. Oseman herself is aroace, and draws upon some of her experiences in the novel.

The J-drama Koisenu Futari (English title: Two People Who Can’t Fall In Love) is about the friendship between Satoru Takahashi and Sakuko Kodama, an aroace man and woman.

Aromancing of Gwendolyn Poole (originally titled Love Unlimited: Gwenpool) is a 2023 comic anthology that explores Gwenpool's relationship with sex and romance, with the final installment having her realize that she is aroace.

YouTube animator Jaiden Animations came out as aroace in March 2022 in a video called "Being Not Straight".

Debates about whether or not certain characters are aroace often comes from lack of creator confirmation on a wider platform, such as the widely recognized readings of characters such as Saiki from The Disastrous Life of Saiki K being aroace.
