= Demiromanticism =

Romantic orientation on the aromantic spectrum

- Etymology: From Old French demi ('half'), ultimately from Latin dimidius
- Classification: Romantic orientation
- Parent category: Aromantic spectrum

Other terms
- Associated terms: Aromanticism, demisexuality

Flag
- Demiromantic pride flag
- Flag name: Demiromantic pride flag

Demiromanticism is a romantic orientation on the aromantic spectrum characterized by experiencing romantic attraction only after forming a close emotional bond. Recognized by organizations such as GLAAD, it is considered an intermediate identity between aromanticism and alloromanticism (regularly experiencing romantic attraction). The term was coined in 2008 on the Asexual Visibility and Education Network (AVEN). The time required to form this bond varies significantly among individuals.

== Overview ==
Under the split attraction model, romantic and sexual attraction are viewed as distinct. Consequently, demiromanticism does not determine a person's sexual orientation; an individual may identify with any sexual identity (such as heterosexual, homosexual, pansexual, or demisexual). In academic literature, the combination of differing romantic and sexual orientations (such as heterosexual demiromantic) is categorized as a discordant orientation.

In models of attraction, demiromanticism is characterized by the presence of secondary romantic attraction – which develops only after establishing an emotional bond – and the absence of primary romantic attraction. The prerequisite emotional bond may be platonic, sexual, or another kind of connection. While developing affection over time is common in romantic relationships, demiromanticism is distinguished by an inability to experience initial infatuation or crushes based on immediately apparent traits.

== Demographics ==
Surveys of asexual and aromantic communities indicate that demiromantics make up a consistent minority within the broader spectrum. In a 2011 census of 3,436 asexual-spectrum individuals, 12.1% identified as demiromantic. Similarly, the 2020 Aro Census by AUREA (surveying over 9,500 respondents) reported that approximately 14% identified as demiromantic.

The 2020 survey also noted behavioral differences within the aromantic spectrum: demiromantic respondents were the group most likely to report having experienced romantic attraction at some point in their lives and – alongside cupioromantic individuals – were among the most likely to desire a romantic relationship.

== Symbolism ==
The demiromantic pride flag parallels the demisexual flag in design. It features a black triangle on the hoist pointing toward three horizontal stripes: a thick white stripe at the top, a thin green stripe in the center, and a thick gray stripe at the bottom. While interpretations of the flag's colors vary, the green stripe is commonly interpreted as representing either the aromantic spectrum or demiromanticism itself, white represents platonic attraction and queerplatonic relationships, gray represents gray-aromanticism, and the black triangle represents sexuality.
