= Aze (magazine) =

Literary magazine

- Volume 5, issue 3 on Family (2022)
- Categories: Literary magazine
- Founder: Michael Paramo
- Founded: 2016
- First issue: May 2017; 8 years ago
- Website: azejournal.com

Aze (stylized AZE) is a literary magazine for asexual, aromantic, and agender people that was created in 2016 and publishes issues online. It was formerly known as The Asexual until 2019 when it expanded to include aromantic and agender people. The magazine publishes visual art, poetry, and personal and academic essays on the subjects of asexuality, aromanticism, and agender experiences and their various intersections. It was founded by Michael Paramo.

It is listed as an educational resource by some American university centers and elsewhere, including Alice Oseman's young-adult fiction book Loveless (2022). Writing in Aze has been referenced in scholarship published by Feminist Formations, Sexualities, Archives of Sexual Behavior, Communication Education, and others.

== Content ==
Aze publishes content online in magazine volumes of four issues. In 2019, the magazine changed its name from The Asexual to AZE to represent a shift in its content's focus beyond asexual identity, including gray-asexuality and demisexuality, as well as people on the aromantic spectrum and agender people. The magazine had previously published an issue focusing on agender experiences in 2018.

Most issues focus on a specific intersection or topic related to asexual, aromantic, and agender experiences. Themes that have been explored in the magazine's issues have included "Asexual Masculinities," "Redefining Relationships," and "Aromanticism." Other issues have focused on body image, race, media representation, gender, sexuality, and attraction. It has published interviews with Pragati Singh in 2018 and 2023.

The magazine's content is edited by the founder Michael Paramo. The magazine was discussed in an interview for Sex Out Loud with Tristan Taormino in 2019. Its content was referenced in Ending the Pursuit, a book about asexuality, aromanticism, and agender identity published by Unbound in 2024.

== Reception ==
Aze's focus on publishing asexual, aromantic, and agender people's perspectives has been recognized as unique since these experiences are "often absent from the mainstream." The magazine is listed as a resource by the Asexual Visibility and Education Network, Sounds Fake but Okay, some American university resource centers, and in Alice Oseman's young-adult fiction book Loveless (2022).

The magazine has been noted for its inclusion of people of color within the asexual, aromantic, and agender communities, particularly of BIPOC and Latinx people. Janeth Montenegro Marquez argued that "AZE does a good job of creating a niche for individuals who crave it" by providing "other queer individuals, queer BIPOC individuals especially, a space of community to explore their identities" and theorize about their experiences where they may not be able to "in other queer spaces." The magazine's issue on race was noted by Foster et al. to contribute to expanding perceptions of the asexual community beyond whiteness. Justin Smith referenced a poem published on Aze to argue that there are inherent connections between blackness and asexuality. Ben Brandley and Angela Labrador cited an article from the magazine that argued how people of color may feel excluded from the asexual community.

Scholar Anna Kurowicka referenced the magazine's issue on disability to examine the intersections between asexuality and disability narratives, arguing for the need to trouble the boundaries between both experiences.

In a book edited by Angela M. Schubert and Mark Pope, authors Stacey Litam and Megan Speciale refer to an article published on Aze that discusses different types of attraction as multi-layered, including sexual, romantic, aesthetic, sensual, emotional, and intellectual, to argue for the need to expand notions of attraction beyond sexual attraction within the context of interpersonal relationships.

== See also ==
- Asexual Visibility and Education Network
- Free From Desire
- Sounds Fake but Okay
