= Michael Paramo =

American writer

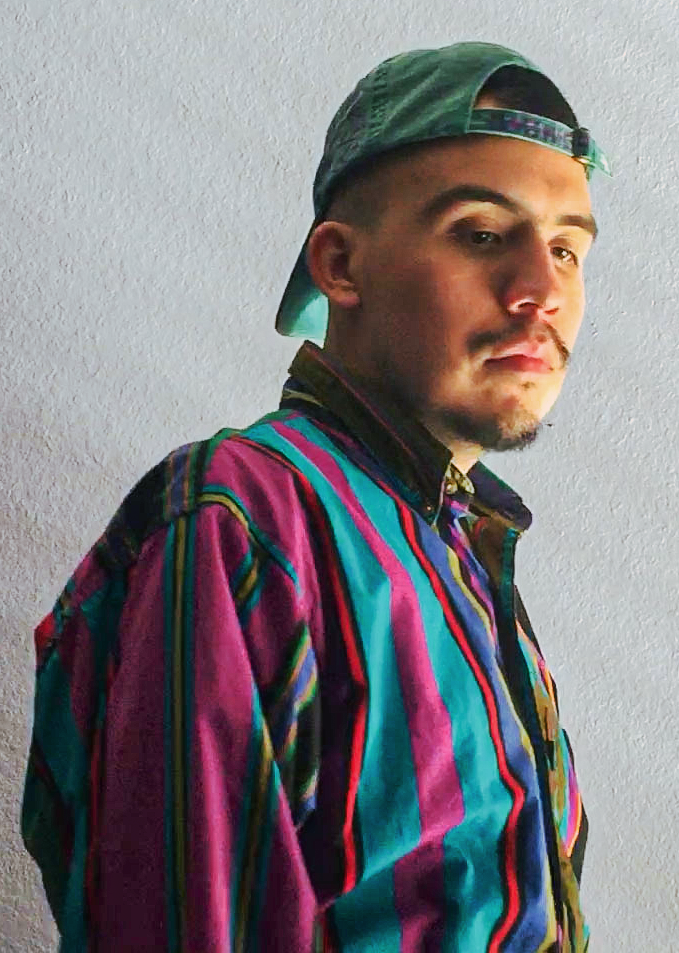
- Paramo in 2024.
- Born: 1993 (age 32–33)
- Education: California State University, Fullerton
- Notable work: Aze
- Website: https://azejournal.com/mxparamo

Michael Paramo is an American writer, academic, and artist. He founded the literary magazine Aze in 2016. His research examines human sexuality, romance, love, interpersonal attraction, and gender. He published a book Ending the Pursuit in 2024.

== Early life ==
Paramo is of Mexican American descent and grew up in Southern California. He attended California State University, Fullerton and studied American Studies.

== Career ==
=== Aze ===
Paramo created the literary journal Aze in 2016 (originally known as The Asexual). He authored several essays that were published on the platform, including on the whiteness of the asexual community, the split attraction model. and the coloniality of gender. Paramo's writing was referenced in regard to the visibility of asexual people of color in Communication Education and the Journal of Folklore Research.

Paramo interviewed Pragati Singh on Aze in 2018 on the subject of asexual awareness in India. The magazine also reached 10,000 followers on Twitter. In 2019, the magazine's name changed from The Asexual to Aze.

=== Book ===
In 2019, Paramo was interviewed by Tristan Taormino on asexuality, aromanticism, and agender identity for a book he was writing. He began attending the University of British Columbia as a PhD student in the Gender, Race, Sexuality and Social Justice program.

Paramo published Ending the Pursuit: Asexuality, Aromanticism, and Agender Identity with Unbound in 2024, which questioned social norms of sex, romance, and gender. Academic Ela Przybyło wrote "Paramo refuses to take for granted the normalized ideas we are fed around how relationships should work and what they should look like." In an interview for Geeks OUT, Paramo spoke to the inclusion of poetry in the book as a hybrid method of interweaving critical and creative expressions.

=== Research ===
Paramo was referred to by ITV's platform Planet Woo as "one of the globe's leading aro academics" in 2024. His concept of azeness was described as a politics of refusing settler colonial norms of sexuality, romance, and gender or cisheteropatriarchy. A 2025 article in Sexualities wrote that he linked asexuality with "wider critiques of white supremacy, heteronormativity and neoliberalism."

== Personal life ==
Paramo identifies on the asexual and aromantic spectrum. He also creates visual art and music.
