= Coming out =

Process of revealing one's attributes

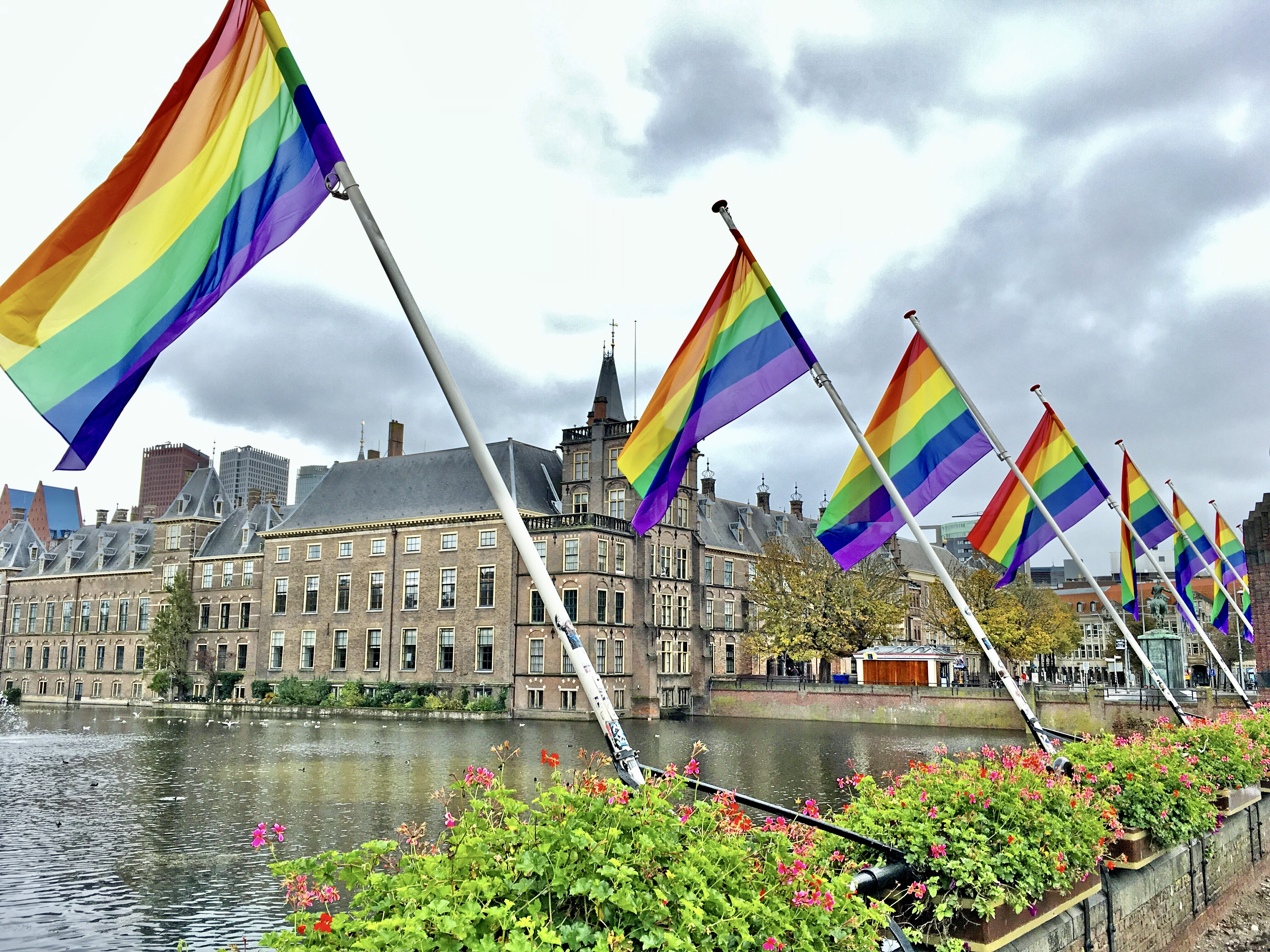
Rainbow flags raised to celebrate National Coming Out Day in the Netherlands

Coming out of the closet, often shortened to coming out, is a metaphor mostly used to describe LGBTQ people's self-disclosure of their sexual orientation, romantic orientation, or gender identity. While mostly used in contexts involving sexual orientation or gender identity, it is sometimes used as a shorthand in other identity self-disclosure contexts, such as the revelation of atheism or irreligion, or of one's political affiliations.

LGBTQ self-disclosure is often framed and debated as a privacy issue because the consequences may be very different for different individuals, some of whom may have their job security or personal security threatened by such disclosure. The act may be viewed as a psychological process or journey; decision-making or risk-taking; a strategy or plan; a mass or public event; a speech act and a matter of personal identity; a rite of passage; liberation or emancipation from oppression; an ordeal; a means toward feeling LGBTQ pride instead of shame and social stigma; or a career-threatening act.

The term coming out of the closet is the source of other gay slang expressions related to voluntary disclosure or lack thereof. LGBTQ people who have already revealed or no longer conceal their sexual orientation or gender identity are out of the closet or simply out, i.e., openly LGBTQ. By contrast, LGBTQ people who have yet to come out or have opted not to do so are labelled as closeted or being in the closet. Outing is the deliberate or accidental disclosure of an LGBTQ person's sexual orientation or gender identity by someone else, without the first individual's consent. By extension, outing oneself is self-disclosure. Glass closet refers to the open secret of a public figure widely thought to be LGBTQ even though the person has not officially come out.

== History ==
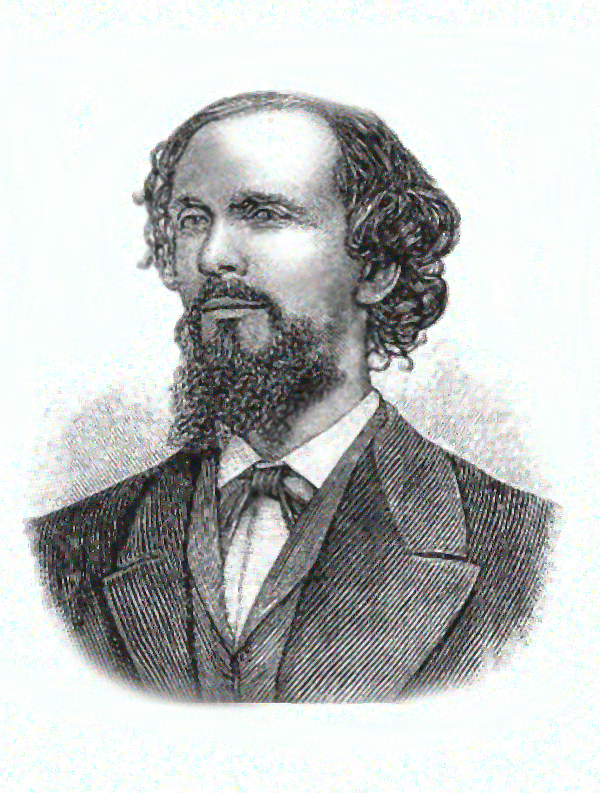
19th-century gay rights advocate Karl Heinrich Ulrichs

Between 1864 and 1869, Karl Heinrich Ulrichs wrote a series of pamphlets – as well as giving a lecture to the Association of German Jurists in 1867 – advocating decriminalization of sex acts between men, in which he was candid about his own homosexuality. Historian Robert Beachy has said of him, "I think it is reasonable to describe [Ulrichs] as the first gay person to publicly out himself."

In early 20th-century Germany, "coming out" was labeled as "self-denunciation" and entailed serious legal and reputational risks. In his 1906 work, Das Sexualleben unserer Zeit in seinen Beziehungen zur modernen Kultur (The sexual life of our time in its relation to modern civilization), Iwan Bloch, a German-Jewish physician, entreated elderly homosexuals to self-disclose to their family members and acquaintances. In 1914, Magnus Hirschfeld revisited the topic in his major work The Homosexuality of Men and Women, discussing the social and legal potential of several thousand homosexual men and women of rank, revealing their sexual orientation to the police in order to influence legislators and public opinion. Hirschfeld did not support 'self-denunciation' and dismissed the possibilities of a political movement based on open homosexuals.

The first prominent American to reveal his homosexuality was the poet Robert Duncan. In 1944, using his own name in the anarchist magazine Politics, he wrote that homosexuals were an oppressed minority. The decidedly clandestine Mattachine Society, founded by Harry Hay and other veterans of the Wallace for President campaign in Los Angeles in 1950, moved into the public eye after Hal Call took over the group in San Francisco in 1953. Many gays emerged from the closet there.

In 1951, Donald Webster Cory published his landmark The Homosexual in America, saying, "Society has handed me a mask to wear ... Everywhere I go, at all times and before all sections of society, I pretend." Cory was a pseudonym, but his frank and openly subjective descriptions served as a stimulus to the emerging homosexual self-awareness and the nascent homophile movement.

In the 1960s, Frank Kameny came to the forefront of the struggle. Having been fired from his job as an astronomer for the Army Map service in 1957 for homosexual behavior, because it was considered to make people vulnerable to blackmail pressure and endanger secure positions, Kameny refused to go quietly. He openly fought his dismissal, eventually appealing it to the US Supreme Court. As a vocal leader of the growing movement, Kameny argued for unapologetic public actions. The cornerstone of his conviction was that, "we must instill in the homosexual community a sense of worth to the individual homosexual", which could only be achieved through campaigns openly led by homosexuals themselves.

With the spread of consciousness raising (CR) in the late 1960s, coming out became a key strategy of the gay liberation movement to raise political consciousness to counter heterosexism and homophobia. At the same time and continuing into the 1980s, gay and lesbian social support discussion groups, some of which were called "coming-out groups", focused on sharing coming-out "stories" (accounts) with the goal of reducing isolation and increasing LGBTQ visibility and pride.

== Etymology ==
The present-day expression "coming out" is understood to have originated in the early 20th century from an analogy that likens homosexuals' introduction into gay subculture to a débutante's coming-out party. This is a celebration for a young upper-class woman who is making her début – her formal presentation to society – because she has reached adult age or has become eligible for marriage. As historian George Chauncey points out:

Gay people in the pre-war years [pre-WWI] ... did not speak of coming out of what we call "the gay closet" but rather of coming out into what they called "homosexual society" or the "gay world", a world neither so small, nor so isolated, nor, often, so hidden as "closet" implies.

In fact, as Elizabeth Kennedy observes, "using the term 'closet' to refer to" previous times such as "the 1920s and 1930s might be anachronistic".

An article on coming out in the online encyclopedia glbtq.com states that sexologist Evelyn Hooker's observations introduced the use of "coming out" to the academic community in the 1950s. The article continues by echoing Chauncey's observation that a subsequent shift in connotation occurred later on. The pre-1950s focus was on entrance into "a new world of hope and communal solidarity", whereas the post-Stonewall Riots overtone was an exit from the oppression of the closet. This change in focus suggests that "coming out of the closet" is a mixed metaphor that joins "coming out" with the closet metaphor: an evolution of "skeleton in the closet" specifically referring to living a life of denial and secrecy by concealing one's sexual orientation. The closet metaphor, in turn, is extended to the forces and pressures of heterosexist society and its institutions.

== Identity issues ==
When coming out is described as a gradual process or a journey, it is meant to include becoming aware of and acknowledging one's gender identity, gender expression, or non-hetero-normative sexual orientation or attraction. This preliminary stage, which involves soul-searching or a personal epiphany, is often called "coming out to oneself" and constitutes the start of self-acceptance. Many LGBTQ people say that this stage began for them during adolescence or childhood, when they first became aware of their sexual orientation toward members of the same sex.

Coming out has also been described as a process because of a recurring need or desire to come out in new situations in which LGBTQ people are assumed to be heterosexual or cisgender, such as at a new job or with new acquaintances. A major frame of reference for those coming out has included using an inside/outside perspective, where some assume that the person can keep their identity or orientation a secret and separate from their outside appearance. This is not as simple as often thought, as Diana Fuss (1991) argues, "the problem of course with the inside/outside rhetoric ... is that such polemics disguise the fact that most of us are both inside and outside at the same time".

=== LGBTQ identity development ===
Every coming out story is the person trying to come to terms with who they are and their sexual orientation. Several models have been created to describe coming out as a process for gay and lesbian identity development, e.g., Dank, 1971; Cass, 1984; Coleman, 1989; Troiden, 1989. Of these models, the most widely accepted is the Cass identity model established by Vivienne Cass. This model outlines six discrete stages transited by individuals who successfully come out: identity confusion, identity comparison, identity tolerance, identity acceptance, identity pride, and identity synthesis. However, not every LGBTQ person follows such a model. For example, some LGBTQ youth become aware of and accept their same-sex desires or gender identity at puberty in a way similar to which heterosexual teens become aware of their sexuality, i.e., free of any notion of difference, stigma or shame in terms of the gender of the people to whom they are attracted. Regardless of whether LGBTQ youth develop their identity based on a model, the typical age at which youth in the United States come out has been dropping. High school students and even middle school students are coming out.

Emerging research suggests that gay men from religious backgrounds are likely to come out online via Facebook and other social networks, such as blogs, as they offer a protective interpersonal distance. This largely contradicts the growing movement in social media research indicating that online use, particularly Facebook, can lead to negative mental health outcomes such as increased levels of anxiety. While further research is needed to assess whether these results generalize to a larger sample, these recent findings open the door to the possibility that gay men's online experiences may differ from those of heterosexuals in that these may be more likely to provide mental health benefits rather than consequences.

=== Transgender identity and coming out ===
Actress Abigail Thorn coming out as transgender

Transgender people vary greatly in choosing when, whether, and how to disclose their transgender status to family, close friends, and others. The prevalence of discrimination and violence against transgender people (in the United States, for example, transgender people are 28 percent more likely to be victims of violence) can make coming out a risky decision. Fear of retaliatory behavior, such as being removed from the parental home while underage, is a reason for transgender people to delay coming out to their families until they have reached adulthood. Parental confusion and lack of acceptance of a transgender child may result in parents treating a newly revealed gender identity as a "phase" or making efforts to change their children back to "normal" by using mental health services to alter the child's gender identity.

The internet can play a significant role in the coming out process for transgender people. Some come out in an online identity first, providing an opportunity to go through experiences virtually and safely before risking social sanctions in the real world. But, while many trans people find support online that they may not have in real life, others encounter bullying and harassment. According to a study published by Blumenfeld and Cooper in 2012, youth who identify as LGBTQ are 22 percent less likely to report online bullying because they may have parents who do not believe or understand them, or they fear having to come out in order to explain the incident. This further shows the barriers that trans individuals can have when coming out.

Coming out as transgender can be more complex than coming out as a sexual minority. Visible changes that can occur as part of changing one's gender identity – such as wardrobe changes, hormone replacement therapy, and name changes – can make coming out to other people less of a choice. Further, elements that accompany a change in gender can have financial, physical, medical, and legal implications. Additionally, transgender individuals can experience prejudice and rejection from sexual minorities and others in the LGBTQ community, in addition to the larger LGBTQ bias they can face from mainstream culture, which can feel isolating.

=== Asexual and aromantic identity ===
Asexual and aromantic people might experience different challenges when coming out that other individuals in the LGBTQ community may not face. The 2018 National LGBT Survey in the United Kingdom found that only 17 percent of asexuals received positive responses when coming out, in comparison to over 40 percent for other LGBTQ people. A 2016 study found that asexual individuals commonly experienced skepticism and misunderstanding over the existence of their identity when coming out as asexual. A 2024 review by Michael Paramo noted that asexual and aromantic people are commonly tasked with educating people about their identities when coming out because of a lack of understanding over their existence.

Asexual and aromantic people may face risks of sexual assault, coercion, or other pressures to conform to sexual or romantic behavior from their sexual or romantic partners or external to their relationships. They can also experience being rejected by a partner or love interest for being asexual or aromantic, which may make some asexual and aromantic people tentative to come out. A 2023 study co-authored by Yasmin Benoit found that asexual people in the UK were unlikely to reveal their identity within healthcare settings for fear of being pressured to conform to sexual behavior. Online role models may be helpful for asexual people when coming out because of a lack of representation surrounding asexuality.

== Legal issues ==
In areas of the world where homosexual acts are penalized or prohibited, gay men, lesbians, and bisexual people can suffer legal consequences for coming out. In particular, where homosexuality is a crime, coming out may constitute self-incrimination. These laws still exist in 75 countries worldwide, including Egypt, Iran, and Afghanistan.

People who decide to come out as non-binary or transgender often face more varied and different issues from a legal standpoint. Worldwide, legally changing your documented gender or name based on your identity is often prohibited or extremely difficult. A major negative effect of the inequality in regulations comes in the form of mental effects, as transgender people who have to legally announce a gender they do not identify with or their dead name can face uncomfortable situations and stress.

== Effects ==
In the early stages of the LGBTQ identity development process, people can feel confused and undergo turmoil. In 1993, Michelangelo Signorile wrote Queer in America, in which he explored the harm caused both to a closeted person and to society in general by being closeted.

Because LGBTQ people have historically been marginalized as sexual minorities, coming out of the closet remains a challenge for most of the world's LGBTQ population and can lead to a backlash of heterosexist discrimination and violence against LGBTQ people.

Studies have found that concealing sexual orientation is related to poorer mental health, physical health, and relationship functioning. For example, it has been found that same-sex couples who have not come out are not as satisfied in their relationships as same-sex couples who have. Findings from another study indicate that the fewer people who know about a lesbian's sexual orientation, the more anxiety, less positive affectivity, and lower self-esteem she has. Further, Gay.com states that closeted individuals are reported to be at increased risk for suicide.

Depending on the relational bond between parents and children, a child coming out as lesbian, gay, bisexual or transgender can be positive or negative. Strong, loving relationships between children and their parents may be strengthened but if a relationship is already strained, those relationships may be further damaged or destroyed by the child coming out. If people coming out are accepted by their parents, it allows open discussions of dating and relationships and enables parents to help their children with coping with discrimination and to make healthier decisions regarding HIV/AIDS and other sexually transmitted diseases. Because parents, families, and close others can also reject someone coming out, the LGBTQ individual may not always enjoy positive effects from the decision. For example, teens who had parents who rejected them when they came out showed more drug use, depression, suicide attempts, and risky sexual behaviors later on as young adults. Some studies find that the health effects of coming out depend more on the reactions of parents than on the disclosure itself.

A number of studies have been done on the effect of people coming out to their parents. A 1989 report by Robinson et al. of parents of out gay and lesbian children in the United States found that 21 percent of fathers and 28 percent of mothers had suspected that their child was gay or lesbian, largely based on gender atypical behavior during childhood. The 1989 study found that two-thirds of parents reacted negatively. A 1995 study (that used young people's reactions) found that half of the mothers of gay or bisexual male college students "responded with disbelief, denial or negative comments", while fathers reacted slightly better. Furthermore, 18 percent of parents reacted "with acts of intolerance, attempts to convert the child to heterosexuality, and verbal threats to cut off financial or emotional support".

If rejected by their families, many LGBTQ youth can become homeless during the coming out process. LGBTQ youth are among the largest population of homeless youth; this has typically been caused by the reaction of others, especially parents, to self-identification and acknowledgment of being gay, or identifying with the LGBTQ community. About 20 to 30 percent of homeless youth identify as LGBTQ. Native and Indigenous LGBTQ youth make up the largest population to suffer homelessness: 44 percent, compared to any other race. 55 percent of homeless LGBTQ and 67 percent of homeless transgender youth were forced out of their homes by their parents or ran away because of their sexual orientation or gender identity and expression. Compared to transgender women and non-binary youth, transgender men have the highest percentage of housing instability. Homelessness among LGBTQ youth also affects many areas of an individual's life, leading to higher rates of victimization, depression, suicidal ideation, substance abuse, risky sexual behavior, and participation in more illegal and dangerous activities. A 2016 study on homelessness pathways among Latino LGBTQ youth found that homelessness among LGBTQ individuals can also be attributed to structural issues such as systems of care, and sociocultural and economic factors.

Jimmie Manning performed a study in 2015 on positive and negative behavior performed during the coming out conversation. During his study, he learned that almost all of his participants would attribute negative behaviors only to themselves during the coming out conversations, and positive behaviors to the recipient of the conversation. Manning suggests further research into this to figure out a way for positive behaviors to be seen and performed equally by both the recipient and the individual coming out.

== In/out metaphors ==
=== Dichotomy ===
The closet narrative sets up an implicit dualism between being "in" or being "out", wherein those who are "in" are often stigmatized as living false, unhappy lives. Likewise, philosopher and critical analyst Judith Butler (1991) states that the in/out metaphor creates a binary opposition which pretends that the closet is dark, marginal, and false, and that being out in the "light of illumination" reveals a true (or essential) identity. Nonetheless, Butler is willing to appear at events as a lesbian and maintains that "it is possible to argue that ... there remains a political imperative to use these necessary errors or category mistakes ... to rally and represent an oppressed political constituency".

=== Criticisms ===
Diana Fuss (1991) explains, "the problem of course with the inside/outside rhetoric ... is that such polemics disguise the fact that most of us are both inside and outside at the same time". Further, "To be out, in common gay parlance, is precisely to be no longer out; to be out is to be finally outside of exteriority and all the exclusions and deprivations such outsiderhood imposes. Or, put another way, to be out is really to be in – inside the realm of the visible, the speakable, the culturally intelligible." In other words, coming out constructs the closet it supposedly destroys and the self it supposedly reveals, "the first appearance of the homosexual as a 'species' rather than a 'temporary aberration' also marks the moment of the homosexual's disappearance – into the closet".

Furthermore, Seidman, Meeks, and Traschen (1999) argue that "the closet" may be becoming an antiquated metaphor in the lives of modern-day Americans for two reasons.

1. Homosexuality is becoming increasingly normalized, and the shame and secrecy often associated with it appears to be in decline.
2. The metaphor of the closet hinges upon the notion that stigma management is a way of life, yet stigma management may increasingly be done according to varied situations.

However, when understood as an act of self-disclosure, coming out (like any self-disclosure) cannot be accomplished once, and for all. Eve Sedgwick writes in Epistemology of the Closet:

the deadly elasticity of heterosexist presumption means that … people find new walls springing up around them even as they drowse: every encounter with a new classful of students, to say nothing of a new boss, social worker, loan officer, landlord, doctor, erects new closets whose fraught and characteristic laws of optics and physics exact from at least gay people new surveys, new calculations, new draughts and requisitions of secrecy or disclosure.

As Tony Adams demonstrates in Narrating the Closet, meeting new people makes for a new time to disclose one's sexuality.

== National Coming Out Day ==
Observed annually on 11 October, by members of the LGBTQ communities and their allies, National Coming Out Day is an international civil awareness day for coming out and discussing LGBTQ issues among the general populace in an effort to give a familiar face to the LGBTQ rights movement. This day inspired the United States government to recognize October as LGBTQ History Month.

The day was founded in 1988, by Robert Eichberg, his partner William Gamble, and Jean O'Leary to celebrate the Second National March on Washington for Lesbian and Gay Rights one year earlier, in which 500,000 people marched on Washington, DC, to promote gay and lesbian equality.

In the United States, the Human Rights Campaign manages the event under the National Coming Out Project, offering resources to LGBTQ individuals, couples, parents, and children, as well as straight friends and relatives, to promote awareness of LGBTQ families living honest and open lives. Candace Gingrich became the spokesperson for the day in April 1995. Although still named "National Coming Out Day", this day is observed in Canada, Germany, the Netherlands, and Switzerland also on 11 October, and in the United Kingdom on 12 October. To celebrate National Coming Out Day on 11 October 2002, Human Rights Campaign released an album bearing the same title as that year's theme: Being Out Rocks. Participating artists include Kevin Aviance, Janis Ian, k.d. lang, Cyndi Lauper, Sarah McLachlan, and Rufus Wainwright.

== Media ==
=== Highly publicized comings-out ===
==== Government officials and political candidates ====
- In 1983, US House representative Gerry Studds came out as a homosexual during the 1983 congressional page sex scandal.
- In 1987, Barney Frank, a United States House representative, publicly came out as gay, the second member of the Massachusetts delegation to the United States Congress to do so.
- In 1987, Barnaby Miln, an elected member of the General Synod of the Church of England was the first member of a primary legislative body in the United Kingdom to come out, which meant that as a Magistrate, the first member of the United Kingdom judiciary to come out.
- In 1988, Svend Robinson was the first member of House of Commons of Canada to come out.
- In 1999, Australian senator Brian Greig came out as being gay in his maiden speech to parliament, the first politician to do so in that country.
- In 2004, New Jersey governor Jim McGreevey announced his decision to resign and publicly came out as "a gay American". He acknowledged having had an extramarital affair with a man, Golan Cipel, an Israeli citizen and veteran of the Israel Defense Forces. As McGreevey had appointed him as the New Jersey homeland security adviser, he had created a conflict of interest with the affair.

==== Athletes ====
The first US professional team-sport athlete to come out was David Kopay, a former NFL running back who had played for five teams (San Francisco, Detroit, Washington, New Orleans and Green Bay) between 1964 and 1972. He came out in 1975 in an interview in the Washington Star.

The first professional athlete to come out while still playing was Czech-American tennis player Martina Navratilova, who came out as a lesbian during an interview with The New York Times in 1981. English footballer Justin Fashanu came out in 1990 and was subject to homophobic taunts from spectators, opponents and teammates for the rest of his career.

In 1995 while at the peak of his playing career, Ian Roberts became the first high-profile Australian sports person and first rugby footballer in the world to come out as gay. John Amaechi, who played in the NBA with the Utah Jazz, Orlando Magic and Cleveland Cavaliers (as well as internationally with Panathinaikos BC of the Greek Basketball League and Kinder Bologna of the Italian Basketball League), came out in February 2007 on ESPN's Outside the Lines program. He also wrote a memoir, Man in the Middle, published by ESPN Books, which explores his professional and personal life as a closeted basketball player. He was the first NBA player (former or current) to come out.

In 2008, Australian diver Matthew Mitcham became the first openly gay athlete to win an Olympic gold medal. He achieved this at the Beijing Olympics in the men's 10-meter platform event.

The first Irish county GAA player to come out while still playing was hurler Dónal Óg Cusack in October 2009, in previews of his autobiography. Gareth Thomas, who played international rugby union and rugby league for Wales, came out in a Daily Mail interview in December 2009 near the end of his career.

In 2013, American basketball player Jason Collins (a member of the Washington Wizards) came out as gay, becoming the first active male professional athlete in a major North American team sport to publicly come out as gay.

On 15 August 2013, WWE wrestler Darren Young came out, making him the first openly gay active professional wrestler.

On 9 February 2014, former Missouri defensive lineman Michael Sam came out as gay. He was drafted by the St. Louis Rams on 10 May 2014, with the 249th overall pick in the seventh round, making him the first openly gay player to be drafted by an NFL franchise. He was released by St. Louis and waived by the Dallas Cowboys practice squad. Sam was on the roster for the Montreal Alouettes, but has since retired from football.

On 21 June 2021, Las Vegas Raiders defensive end Carl Nassib announced on his Instagram account that he is gay, becoming the first active NFL player to come out publicly.

In October 2021, professional soccer player Josh Cavallo came out as gay via videos posted to his team's social media accounts, becoming the only openly gay top-level professional soccer player in the world.

In May 2022, Blackpool F.C. forward Jake Daniels came out as gay, becoming the first active male British footballer to do so since Justin Fashanu in 1990.

In February 2023, Czech footballer Jakub Jankto, then a AC Sparta Prague midfielder on loan from Spanish side Getafe CF announced he was gay on Twitter, becoming the first male footballer to come out while an active international player.

==== Artists and entertainers ====
In 1997 on The Oprah Winfrey Show, American comedian Ellen DeGeneres came out as a lesbian. Her real-life coming out was echoed in the sitcom Ellen in "The Puppy Episode", in which her character Ellen Morgan outs herself over the airport public address system.

On 29 March 2010, Puerto Rican singer Ricky Martin came out publicly in a post on his official web site, stating, "I am proud to say that I am a fortunate homosexual man. I am very blessed to be who I am." Martin said that "these years in silence and reflection made me stronger and reminded me that acceptance has to come from within and that this kind of truth gives me the power to conquer emotions I didn't even know existed." Singer Adam Lambert came out after pictures of him kissing another man were publicly circulated while he was a participant on the eighth season of American Idol. In January 2013, while accepting the honorary Golden Globe Cecil B. DeMille Award, American actress and director Jodie Foster made the first public acknowledgment of her sexual orientation, saying; "I already did my coming out a thousand years ago, in the Stone Age, in those very quaint days when a fragile young girl would open up to friends and family and co-workers then gradually to everyone that knew her, everyone she actually met."

==== Military personnel ====
In 1975, Leonard Matlovich, while serving in the United States Air Force, came out to challenge the US military's policies banning service by homosexuals. Widespread coverage included a Time magazine cover story and a television movie on NBC.

In 2011, as the US prepared to lift restrictions on service by openly gay people, Senior Airman Randy Phillips conducted a social media campaign to garner support for coming out. The video he posted on YouTube of the conversation in which he told his father he was gay went viral. In one journalist's summation, he "masterfully used social media and good timing to place himself at the centre of a civil rights success story".

==== Pastors ====
In October 2010, megachurch pastor Bishop Jim Swilley came out to his congregation. The YouTube video of the service went viral. Interviews with People magazine, Joy Behar, Don Lemon ABC News and NPR focused on bullycides which Bishop Swilley said had prompted him to "come out". One year later, he confirmed the costs but also the freedom he has experienced. "To be able to have freedom is something that I wouldn't trade anything for." "Being married as yourself, preaching as yourself and living your life as yourself is infinitely better than doing those things as someone else."

Bishop Swilley's son, Jared Swilley, bass player and front man of Black Lips, said, "It was definitely shocking, but I was actually glad when he told me. I feel closer to him now". Bishop Swilley's second son, Judah Swilley, a cast member on the Oxygen show Preachers of Atlanta, is confronting homophobia in the church.

==== Journalists ====
In August 2019, Nicky Bandini, a sportswriter and broadcaster contributing at The Guardian and ESPN came out as transgender, saying that she had previously written under the name Paolo Bandini. She posted a Twitter video and published an opinion piece in The Guardian, saying that it took her several years to come out as transgender. Bandini said she had dealt with gender dysphoria for three-and-a-half decades before finally admitting her status as a trans woman to the world.

=== Depictions of coming out ===
In 1987, a two-part episode of the Quebec television series Avec un grand A, "Lise, Pierre et Marcel", depicted a married closeted man who has to come out when his wife discovers that he has been having an affair with another man. In 1996, the acclaimed British film Beautiful Thing had a positive take in its depiction of two teenage boys coming to terms with their sexual identity.

Author Rodger Streitmatter described Ellen DeGeneres's coming out in the media as well as a 1997 episode of Ellen, "The Puppy Episode", as "rank[ing], hands down, as the single most public exit in gay history", changing media portrayals of lesbians in Western culture. In 1999, Russell T Davies's Queer as Folk, a popular TV series shown on the UK's Channel 4, debuted and focused primarily on the lives of young gay men; in particular on a 15-year-old going through the process of revealing his sexuality to those around him. This storyline was also featured prominently in the US version of Queer as Folk, which debuted in 2000.

The television show The L Word, which debuted in 2004, focuses on the lives of a group of lesbian and bisexual women. The theme of coming out is prominently featured in the storylines of multiple characters.

In the Emmy Award-nominated episode "Gay Witch Hunt" of The Office, Michael inadvertently outs Oscar to the whole office.

Coming Out, which debuted in 2013, is the first Quebec television program about being gay.

Amazon's 2014 series Transparent features a trans woman who comes out to her adult children at the age of 75, and follows her social transition process. The show highlights various reactions from the woman's social circle to her coming out, as well as the many adjustments in language and gender expression that she uses to make her transition. Main character Maura is played by Jeffrey Tambor; the show was criticized by some for casting a cisgender man as a transgender woman.

The third season of the Norwegian teen drama series Skam, released in 2015, focused on a main character coming out and his relationship with another boy.

The film Love, Simon, based on the book Simon vs. the Homo Sapiens Agenda, debuted in 2018. It is the first major studio film about a gay teenager coming out.

In 2020, a second adaption, called Love, Victor, began airing on Hulu. The TV series refers to both the Love, Simon film and the Simon vs. the Homo Sapiens Agenda book. The series premiered its third season in 2022. The series continued and expanded its original story with another young and closeted student.

== Extended use in LGBTQ media, publishing and activism ==
"Out" is a common word or prefix used in the titles of LGBTQ-themed books, films, periodicals, organizations, and TV programs. Some high-profile examples are Out magazine, the defunct OutWeek, and OutTV.

== Non-LGBTQ contexts ==
In political, casual, or even humorous contexts, coming out means by extension the self-disclosure of a person's secret behaviors, beliefs, affiliations, tastes, identities, and interests that may cause astonishment or bring shame. Some examples include: "coming out as an alcoholic", "coming out as a BDSM participant", "coming out of the broom closet" (as a witch), "coming out as a conservative", "coming out as disabled", "coming out as a liberal", "coming out as intersex", "coming out as multiple", "coming out as polyamorous", "coming out as a sex worker", and "coming out of the shadows" as an undocumented immigrant within the United States. The term is also used by members of online body integrity dysphoria communities to refer to the process of telling friends and families about their condition.

With its associated metaphors, the figure of speech has also been extended to atheism, e.g., "coming out as an atheist". A public awareness initiative for freethought and atheism, entitled the "Out Campaign", makes ample use of the "out" metaphor. This campaign was initiated by Robin Elisabeth Cornwell, and is endorsed by prominent atheist Richard Dawkins, who stated "there is a big closet population of atheists who need to 'come out'".

== Impact of COVID-19 pandemic ==
During the COVID-19 pandemic, the order of people to whom LGBTQ children revealed their identity was impacted. Traditionally, children confide in friends before going to their families, but this order has been reversed. It is emphasized that even in these cases, children only tell their families first if they are accepting.

The shift in global circumstances during the pandemic has played a role in the coming out experience for a great number of LGBTQ people. Many were forced to be in unaccepting environments during this time. American LGBTQ people faced a higher risk for negative consequences from the pandemic than their straight counterparts. A lower percentage of these individuals have health coverage, a higher percentage smoke, and a higher percentage maintain employment in vulnerable industries. All of these factors contribute to worse consequences for this population during the pandemic.

The LGBTQ community saw increased feelings of isolation during this time, impacting their coming out experiences. Many individuals described how they lacked an avenue in which to connect with the LGBTQ community, reducing their ability to gain confidence in their identity. Researchers argue that this is seriously detrimental to an already isolated community. However, the ample time for reflection proved beneficial for some individuals regarding their self-image and discovery. Some people were able to come to terms with their identity and increase their confidence as a result. Others felt like the increase in the community's online presence has allowed for more interaction with the community than before.

The lack of in-person celebrations during Pride Month, which is typically held in June, affected the connectedness of the community. These circumstances affecting this important time for the community have reduced the confidence in which LGBTQ people feel comfortable sharing their identities. These face-to-face events are argued to be community-building events. Researchers argue that a crucial aspect of their support system has vanished without them.

These unprecedented global circumstances may have caused individuals to potentially postpone their coming out, influencing their unique stories. It describes how the pandemic has forced many LGBTQ youth to remain in non-accepting households. This, they argue, may also delay their coming out process as well. Mental health may also have been affected as a result of being stuck in these environments. LGBTQ adults faced unique challenges compared to their youth counterparts. Significant job loss compared to non-LGBTQ counterparts occurred, affecting their economic vitality, whereas much of the youth population was forced to remain at home.

There are several instances of the openness of the LGBTQ identity being a disadvantage in the pandemic setting among various countries. In the Philippines, a lesbian couple did not receive food aid during the pandemic because they did not fit the traditional definition of a family. In this instance, the disclosure of their identity did not prove to be in their best interests. The country also resorted to public humiliation when dealing with three gay men who broke the curfew rules.

In terms of gender minorities, several disruptions occurred within the medical environment hindering gender-affirming procedures. Many interruptions occurred with in-person appointments as well. Economic disparities have also played a role in the transgender experience.

== See also ==
- Biphobia
- Down-low (sexual slang)
- Ego-dystonic sexual orientation
- Intersex and LGBTQ
- Labeling theory
- Liberal homophobia
- Questioning (sexuality and gender)
- Terminology of homosexuality
