= The Virus Touch =

2023 non-fiction book by Bishnupriya Ghosh

The Virus Touch: Theorizing Epidemic Media
- Author: Bishnupriya Ghosh
- Publisher: Duke University Press
- Publication date: 2023

The Virus Touch: Theorizing Epidemic Media is a media studies book by Bishnupriya Ghosh. Published in 2023 by Duke University Press, the book discusses events such as the HIV/AIDS crisis and the COVID-19 pandemic, and the way that disease outbreaks in general are discussed, and influenced by, the media.

== General references ==
- Alexander, Travis (2024-04-08). "The Virus Touch: Theorizing Epidemic Media . By Bishnupriya Ghosh". ISLE: Interdisciplinary Studies in Literature and Environment. 31 (1): 230–231. doi:10.1093/isle/isad082. ISSN 1076-0962.
- Danil, Linda Roland (2024-09-23). "Book Review: The Virus Touch: Theorizing Epidemic Media". Sexualities. doi:10.1177/13634607241285081. ISSN 1363-4607.
