= And they were roommates =

Vine video and internet meme

"And they were roommates" refers to a Vine and subsequent Internet meme that originated in October 2014. The video shows a woman saying, "and they were roommates," during a phone conversation, and the cameraman then repeats it. The video went viral, being played over 67 million times by 2018.

Despite Vine's shutdown in 2017, the video has had an enduring cultural legacy. Vice's Sofie Mikhaylova has considered it the best Vine of all time. Remaining a popular meme into the 2020s, the phrase "and they were roommates" has taken on additional cultural meanings.

== Background ==
Logo of Vine

Vine was a social media app that existed from June 2012 to January 2017. On the platform, users could upload and watch six-second videos (also known as Vines) that were played on loop. Described by NBC News as "one of the first social media apps to make the short form video both mainstream and accessible", the app was incredibly popular at its peak.

On October 25, 2014, Vine user @mattsukkar uploaded what would prove to be his final video on the platform. The video is five seconds in length. It shows a woman walking down a sidewalk while on a phone call, passing the idle, elevated cameraman. The woman, in a tone described as indignant, says to the person on the phone, "And they were roommates." The cameraman then turns the camera back on himself and, in a tone described as flat or mocking, says: "Oh my God, they were roommates."

== Context behind the video ==
Given the video's lack of context, its meaning was debated on the Internet for several years. However, in 2022, YourTango's Victoria Soliz wrote about a TikTok by a user named Morgan Faulkner which reportedly reveals the story behind the Vine. In her TikTok, Faulkner claims that the "they were roommates" woman (who has intentionally remained anonymous over the years for privacy) is her coworker. According to Faulkner, in the Vine, her coworker was on the phone with her father, telling a story about her friend from college and that friend's roommate. The roommates started a business together, but after the friend accused her roommate of fraud, the roommate fled the country. As Faulkner's coworker was relaying this story to her father, she walked by a man sitting on a stoop whom she did not know (the Vine's cameraman). Faulkner's coworker heard the man repeat what she had said, interpreted it as him mocking her, yelled at him for being rude, and kept walking.

== Reception and legacy ==
"As a representation of life in 2014, this is it. This is as far as it goes. Sitting on the stoop, filming gossiping strangers wearing white sneakers, making snide commentary about otherwise dull conversation."

— Sofie Mikhaylova, Vice

The Vine went viral; it gained further traction after being uploaded to Tumblr. By April 2018, it had been viewed over 67 million times. Describing the video as a cultural phenomenon, Vice's Sofie Mikhaylova has written: "All I have to do is say, 'And they were roommates,' in a room full of millennials, and I guarantee more than half would get the reference."

Mikhaylova has considered "And they were roommates" to be the best Vine of all time, arguing that it best represents its cultural era. YourTango's Victoria Soliz has commended it as "a meme that has stood the test of time".

=== Shipping and LGBT significance ===
According to The Escapist's Matthew Razak, the Vine "eventually [took] on the idea that the roommates were actually more than just roommates and were sexually involved". The phrase "Oh my God, and they were roommates" subsequently took on a deeper cultural meaning. Among shipping communities, the phrase began to be used to insinuate that some characters were more than just friends. In 2025, Disney's TikTok account made a post referencing the video while featuring several of its sibling characters; the post was quickly taken down amid controversy.

Elite Daily's Dylan Kickham has called the Vine a "popular LGBTQ+ meme". Queer shippers began using the phrase to imply that queer coded characters that live together are labeled as roommates to avoid explicit implications. In that vein, INTO's Henry Giardina has connected the Vine to the broader topic of queer erasure. Writing that "'roommate' as [a euphemism] for life partner dates way back to the Victorian era", he has noted that historians and writers have continued to use the word to ignore queer relationships. He has observed that the phrase "and they were roommates" has been used to call out such erasure. Giardina has summarized: "So yes — what started as a silly meme is actually a kind of activism decades in the making."
