= Queer erasure =

Societal act of dismissing or misrepresenting LGBTQ people

Queer erasure (also known as LGBTQIA+ erasure) refers to the tendency to intentionally or unintentionally remove LGBTQ groups or people from record, or downplay their significance, which includes lesbian, gay, bisexual, transgender, and queer people. This erasure can be found in a number of written and oral texts, including popular and scholarly texts.

== In academia and media ==
Queer historian Gregory Samantha Rosenthal refers to queer erasure in describing the exclusion of LGBTQ history from public history that can occur in urban contexts via gentrification. Rosenthal says this results in the "displacement of queer peoples from public view". Cáel Keegan describes the lack of appropriate and realistic representation of queer people, HIV-positive people, and queer people of color as being a type of aesthetic gentrification, where space is being appropriated from queer people's communities where queer people are not given any cultural representation.

Erasure of LGBTQ+ people has taken place in medical research and schools as well, such as in the case of AIDS research that does not include lesbian populations. Medicine and academia can be places where visibility is produced or erased, such as the exclusion of gay and bisexual women in HIV discourses and studies or the lack of attention to LGBTQ+ identities in dealing with anti-bullying discourse in schools.

== Straightwashing ==
Straightwashing is a form of queer erasure that refers to the portrayal of LGBTQ+ people, fictional characters, or historical figures as heterosexual. It is most prominently seen in works of fiction, whereby characters who were originally portrayed as or intended to be homosexual, bisexual, or asexual are misrepresented as heterosexual.

== Bisexual erasure ==
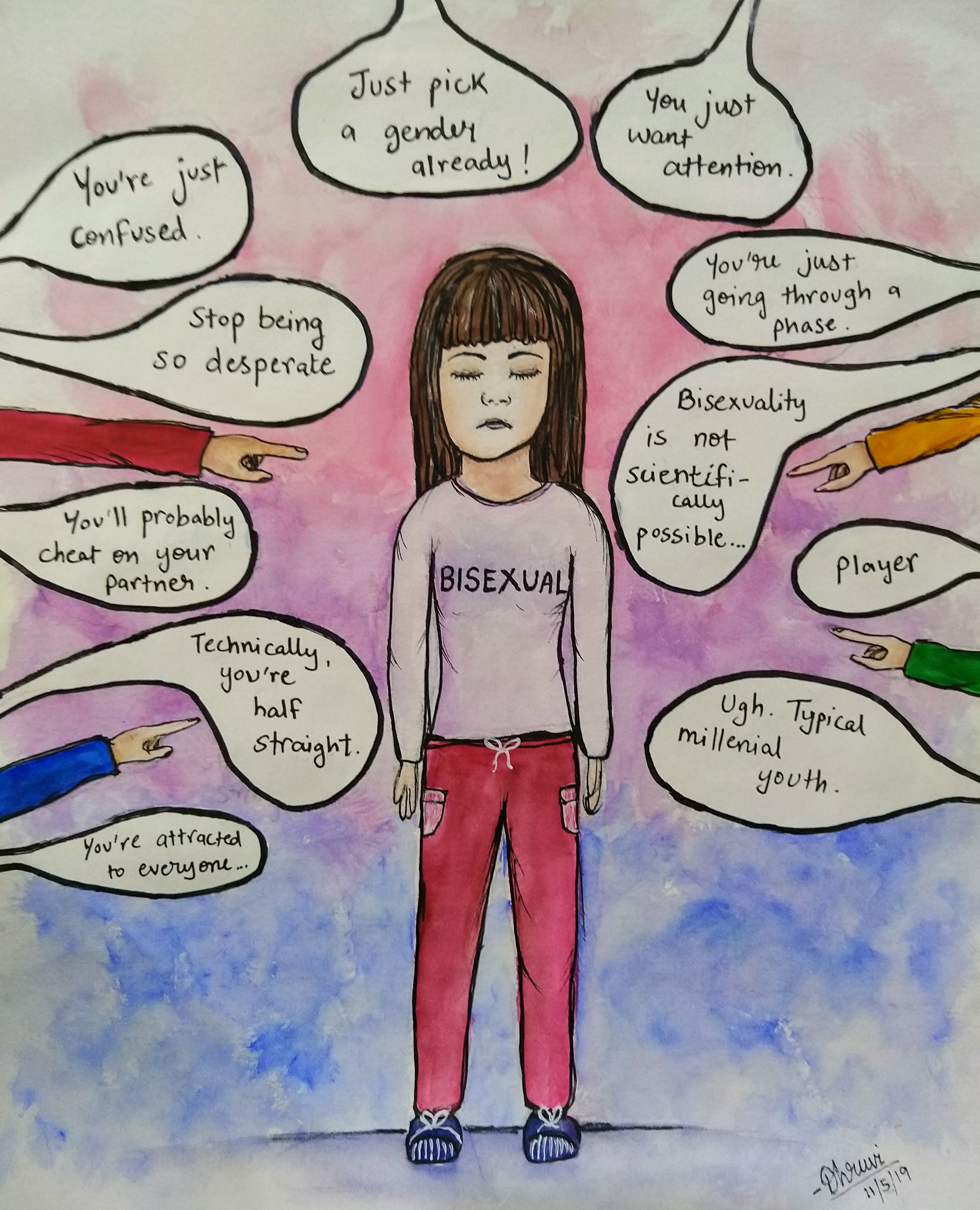
An illustration of examples of various social stigmas against bisexual people

Bisexual erasure (or bi erasure), also called bisexual invisibility, is the tendency to ignore, remove, falsify, or re-explain evidence of bisexuality (or similar identities, such as pansexuality) in history, academia, the news media, and other primary sources. Bisexual erasure happens in both heterosexual and LGBTQ+ communities and bisexual identities are often described as just "phases" or "confusion". Bisexual erasure happens when bisexual people are ignored, dismissed, or downplayed. The lack of recognition towards bisexuality affects bisexual individuals in how they see themselves and how others see them. This erasure then can influence a bisexual person's mental health, identity, and visibility in social, political, and legal spaces.

In its most extreme form, bisexual erasure can include the belief that bisexuality itself does not exist and that individuals who identify as bisexual are either heterosexual or homosexual. People who believe that bisexuality does not exist typically claim that bisexuals are simply confused, or in denial, about their own sexuality. In the case of bisexual men, this commonly manifests in a stereotype that bisexual men are simply closeted gay men. Bisexual individuals are also sometimes dismissed or stereotyped as hypersexual.

Bisexual erasure is often a manifestation of biphobia, although it does not necessarily involve overt antagonism. Erasure frequently results in bisexual-identifying individuals experiencing a variety of adverse social encounters, as they not only have to struggle with finding acceptance within general society but also within the LGBTQ community. Bisexual erasure is a form of stigma and leads to adverse mental health consequences for people who identify as bisexual or similar.

== Homosexual erasure ==
=== Lesbian erasure ===
Lesbian erasure is a form of lesbophobia that involves the tendency to ignore, remove, falsify, or reexplain evidence of lesbian women or relationships in history, academia, the news media, and other primary sources. Lesbian erasure also refers to instances wherein lesbian issues, activism, and identity is deemphasized or ignored within feminist groups, or the LGBTQ community.

== Trans erasure ==
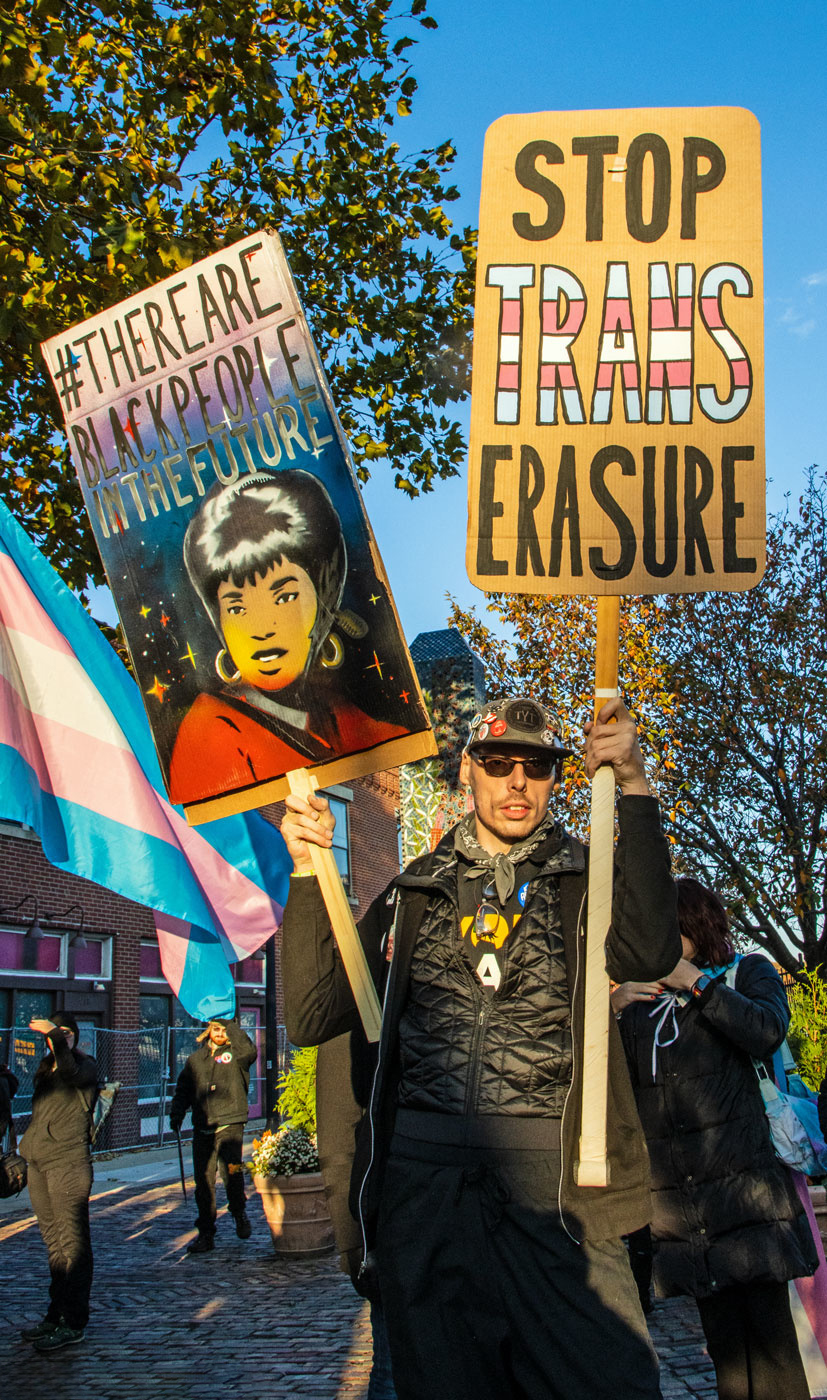

In 2007, Julia Serano discusses trans-erasure in the transfeminist book Whipping Girl. Serano says that transgender people are "effectively erased from public awareness" due to the assumption that everyone is cisgender (non-transgender) or that transgender identification is rare. The notion of transgender erasure has been backed up by later studies.

In 2025, transgender erasure has intensified, particularly in the United States, due to significant policy shifts and executive actions. On January 20, 2025, President Donald Trump issued Executive Order 14168, titled "Defending Women from Gender Ideology Extremism and Restoring Biological Truth to the Federal Government." This order mandates federal agencies to recognize only two sexes, male and female, as determined at conception, effectively disregarding the existence of transgender and nonbinary identities.

Following this directive, numerous federal agencies have removed references to transgender individuals from their materials. For instance, the National Park Service eliminated mentions of transgender people from the Stonewall National Monument's website, altering the acronym "LGBTQ+" to "LGB." Similarly, the Centers for Disease Control and Prevention (CDC) expunged information related to transgender health from its resources and withdrew funding from research projects that promoted what the administration called "gender ideology."

== Aro and ace erasure ==
=== Aromantic erasure ===
Aromantic people are often erased due to the societal expectation that everyone prospers with an exclusive romantic relationship, something that Elizabeth Brake has coined as the term amatonormativity. Aromantic people face continued pressure and prejudice to conform to the "social norms" and form a permanent romantic relationship such as marriage.

=== Asexual erasure ===
Asexual people are often erased due to the societal expectation that everyone experiences sexual attraction, this is known as allonormativity. Asexual people face discrimination due to this stigma, including being pathologized by doctors, with asexuality being seen as a problem needed to be fixed. In the 2018 National LGBT survey in the United Kingdom, a survey shows that asexual people who disclosed their sexuality to healthcare staff had the highest rate of a negative effect on care, and that asexual(23%) people were the only group that had a higher rate of a negative effect than a positive effect.

== Intersex erasure ==
Intersex and transgender individuals are often erased in public health research which conflates sex and gender (see sex–gender distinction). The narrow and inflexible definitions of sex and gender in some countries means some intersex and non-binary people are unable to obtain accurate legal documents or identification, preventing their access to public spaces, jobs, housing, education and basic services. It is only recently that the concept of legal rights for intersex people has been considered, even in LGBTI activist circles. However, there is a growing intersex activist community which campaigns for intersex human rights, and against intersex medical interventions which they see as unnecessary and mistreatment.

Reproductive and genetic technologies have also been discussed as potential mechanisms of intersex erasure. Bioethical scholarship has questioned the use of preimplantation genetic diagnosis to select against embryos with intersex traits, arguing that such practices may reinforce binary assumptions about sex. Scholarship on the medical normalization of intersex bodies has similarly examined how clinical practices can alter or eliminate bodily variation in order to preserve institutional classifications of male and female. These concerns have been extended to CRISPR and related gene-editing technologies, which could move the prevention or modification of variations in sex characteristics into genomic and preimplantation contexts.

== See also ==
- Biphobia
  - Bisexual erasure
  - Lesbian erasure
- Closeted
- Compulsory heterosexuality
- Heteronormativity
- Heterosexism
- Homophobia
  - Discrimination against gay men
  - Lesbophobia
- "LGBT erasure bill"
- Transphobia
  - Discrimination against non-binary people
  - Transmisogyny
  - Discrimination against transgender men
  - International Transgender Day of Visibility
- Queermisia
- Amatonormativity
- Allonormativity
- Aphobia
  - Discrimination against aromantic people
  - Discrimination against asexual people
