= Sounds Fake but Okay =

Comedy podcast on gender and sexuality

- Genre: Comedy; Society & Culture
- Language: English

Cast and voices
- Hosted by: Sarah Costello; Kayla Kaszyca

Production
- Length: 50–70 minutes

Publication
- No. of episodes: 353
- Original release: July 31, 2017
- Updates: Weekly on Sundays

Related
- Website: www.soundsfakepod.com

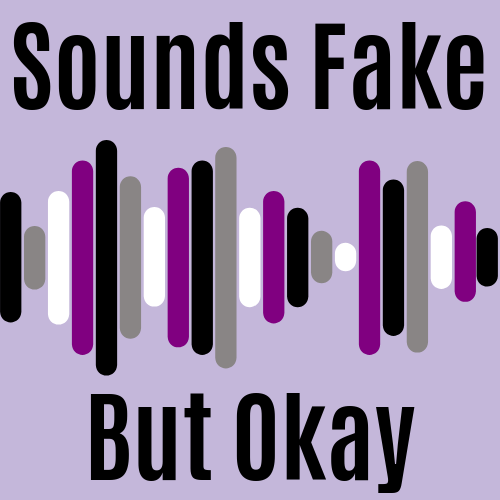
Original logo of the podcast from its launch to the end of July 2021

Sounds Fake but Okay is a weekly comedy podcast that focuses on asexuality and aromanticism. The podcast is hosted by University of Michigan alumni Sarah Costello and Kayla Kaszyca. Each Sunday, Costello and Kaszyca "talk about all things to do with love, relationships, sexuality, and pretty much anything else they just don't understand."

In November 2020, it was honored with the 2020 Discover Pods Award for "Best LGBTQ+ Culture Podcast".

== History ==
Costello and Kaszyca met when they were randomly placed as roommates at the University of Michigan. The pair immediately became best friends. They did not discuss sexuality during their freshman year; neither Costello nor Kaszyca had fully figured out their identities yet. The summer after their freshman year, Costello came out as aromantic asexual through a Tumblr post which Kaszyca subsequently saw.

After this, the pair discussed sexuality regularly. As Costello had never dated, she had many questions for Kaszyca about how relationships and dating worked. The conversations that resulted from questions like "why would you date someone?" and "what is the appeal of kissing someone?" became the inspiration for the podcast.

Over the course of the podcast, Kaszyca realized that she was demisexual. Though she had begun to question her sexuality during her junior year of college, she did not come to terms with it until later. In episode 19 of the podcast, titled "Accepting Your Sexuality", Kaszyca explained how the podcast and Costello had helped her discover new things about herself.

== Format and structure ==
Sounds Fake but Okay is released weekly on Sundays at 14:00 UTC (10:00am Eastern) and episodes are about one hour long. The topics covered in each episode are inspired by conversations and experiences that the hosts share. Topics range from those serious, such as asexual people's place in the queer community, to lighthearted, such as discussions of fandom or pop culture. The episodes are typically casual, with Costello and Kaszyca frequently going off on tangents or switching topics mid-episode. They announced during their first episode back from their hiatus that they would be taking breaks in the winter and summer.

Though the show generally only features Costello and Kaszyca, they are occasionally joined by guests. Guests have included people the hosts met at school, members of Costello's family (both her sister and her mother), and other creators and activists in the asexual and aromantic communities. In episode 117, they were joined by Yasmin Benoit, a notable aro-ace activist and model. They subsequently removed this episode from their playlists at Benoit's request.

They frequently draw suggestions for episode topics and interact with fans through their Discord server.

== Media and events ==
- In December 2018, the podcast was featured in the annual Sex Issue published by The Michigan Daily.
- In June 2019, Costello and Kaszyca appeared on the Star Wars podcast Friends of the Force: A Star Wars Podcast. The group discussed the Eleven-Thirty Eight article "The Asexual Awakens – An Interpretation of the Journey to Adulthood", and Costello put forth her headcanon that Luke Skywalker and Rey of Star Wars are aro-ace.
- In October 2019, the podcast was featured in a series of interview blogs written by the Asexual Visibility and Education Network (AVEN) for Asexual Awareness Week.
- In October 2019, Costello and Kaszyca gave a talk titled "Creating While Asexual" at the University of Michigan Spectrum Center.
- In February 2020, Costello was featured in a series of interview blogs written by the Asexual Visibility and Education Network (AVEN) for Aromantic Spectrum Awareness Week.
- In February 2020, the podcast was featured alongside the aro-ace podcast A OK in an Aromantic Spectrum Awareness Week article by them.
- In May 2020, Costello and Kaszyca hosted a livestream fundraiser to raise money for the World Health Organization/United Nations COVID-19 Solidarity Response Fund. They were joined on the livestream by YouTuber Emi Salida, members of the Aromantic-spectrum Union for Recognition, Education, and Advocacy (AUREA), blogger Rose Sinclair, YouTuber Daniel Walker, comedian Eliott Simpson, podcaster Courtney Lang, activist Yasmin Benoit, and AVEN founder David Jay. Ultimately, $4,111 was raised for the cause.
- In September 2020, Costello and Kaszyca were panelists at the UK Asexuality Conference 2020 Edition. Costello spoke on the Aro Aces panel while Kaszyca spoke on the Romantic Relationships and Grey-Asexuality & Demisexuality panels.
- In January 2021, Costello and Kaszyca were guests on the podcast Queery, discussing aspec identities, getting excluded from the queer community, and their private and public instances of coming out.
- In March 2024, the Michigan magazine Between the Lines published a front page article about Costello and Kaszyca and the creation of the podcast in the March issue of the magazine.

== Book ==
On December 8, 2020, the show's official Twitter account announced that Costello and Kaszyca would be releasing a book, focusing on "the aspec lens, asexual relationships, and how the aspec mindset can apply to every aspect of your life."

On February 21, 2023, the book Sounds Fake but Okay: An Asexual and Aromantic Perspective on Love, Relationships, Sex, and Pretty Much Anything Else was published by Jessica Kingsley Publishers.

== Awards and recognitions ==
- In November 2020, Costello and Kaszyca, along with their podcast, were honored the 2020 Discover Pods Award for "Best LGBTQ+ Culture Podcast".
- In April 2023, Cosmopolitan recognized the podcast as one of the "14 best podcasts of 2023".

== See also ==
- List of LGBTQ podcasts
