= Split attraction model =

Discordance between sexual and romantic attraction

- Simplified diagram of the aromantic and asexual spectra
- Definition: Discordance of romantic attraction and sexual attraction to others
- Abbreviations: SAM

The split attraction model (SAM) is a model in psychology that distinguishes between a person's romantic and sexual attraction, allowing the two to be different from each other.

The model is often extended to include other types of attraction such as platonic, sensual and aesthetic attraction.

== History and identity ==
The first recorded conceptualization of orientation that took into account split attraction was in 1879 by Karl Heinrich Ulrichs, a German writer who published 12 books on non-heterosexual attraction. In these books, Ulrichs presented several classifications that are quite similar to modern LGBTQIA+ identities. Among his works, he described people who are "konjunktiver Uranodioning" and "disjunktiver Uranodioning" or conjunctive bisexuality and disjunctive bisexuality. The former is described as having tender and passionate feelings for both men and women, which would be a biromantic bisexual in modern times. The second is one who has tender feelings for people of the same gender/sex, but 'in love' feelings for people of a different gender/sex, which would now be a heteroromantic homosexual. However, the Ulrichs model never became popular due to its complexity.

A newer example of the separation of sexual and romantic attractions was in 1979 by psychologist Dorothy Tennov, with the publication of her book Love and Limerence: The Experience of Being in Love. In the book, Tennov described limerence as a form of attraction that could be described as a crush on someone. Although Tennov saw sex as part of limerence, she recognized that it was not its main focus. The term "non-limerent" is sometimes considered the precursor of aromantic.

The modern concept of the split attraction model was coined by the asexual and aromantic communities to better describe their identities within the community and to others. The term likely emerged around 2015, though the concept of split attractions had been in use since the origination of the term aromantic in 2005. The model helps people explain how they can still experience certain aspects of one attraction without the need for the other to be a match. A recent research study looked deeper into the relationships of asexuals to help explain how people still form meaningful connections, despite deviance of societal norms.

Relationships formed by people that identify under the split attraction model are often considered outside the norm and may include forms of committed friendships or intimate non-romantic relationships such as queerplatonic relationships.

In a practical application of the model, people of the community commonly refer to themselves by two terms to indicate the differing romantic and sexual attraction; examples include aromantic asexual, colloquially shortened aro-ace, panromantic demisexual or aromantic bisexual. Specific terms exist, such as varioriented and perioriented, describing those with different or similar orientations, respectively. For example, a homoromantic bisexual would be varioriented, while a heteroromantic heterosexual would be labeled as perioriented.

The concept and term are most commonly used within the LGBTQIA+ community, but more recent research found that it may also apply to people outside of the community that are just not yet familiar with the concept.

== Research ==
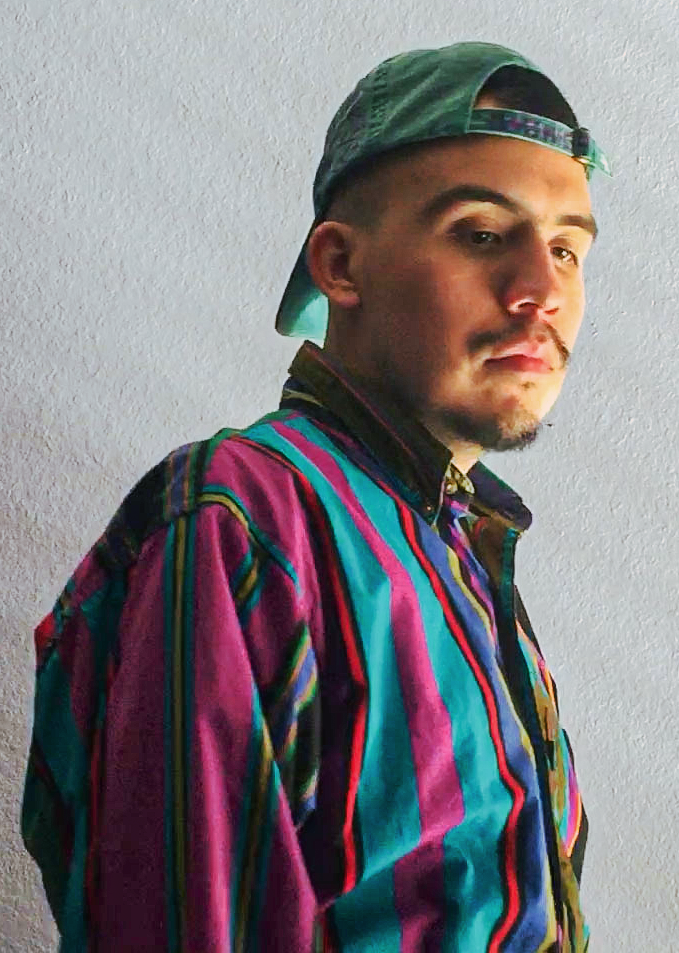
Michael Paramo discussed including different forms of attraction beyond sexual and romantic attraction in a multi-layered model.

The concept that there is a distinction between romantic orientation and sexual orientation has not been studied extensively. American psychologist Lisa M. Diamond, who focuses her studies on sexual orientation and identity, has stated that a person's romantic orientation can differ from whom the person is sexually attracted to. While there is limited research on the discordance between sexual attraction and romantic attraction in individuals, the possibility of fluidity and diversity in attractions have been progressively recognized.

In a 2022 book edited by psychologists Angela M. Schubert and Mark Pope, authors Stacey Litam and Megan Speciale refer to an article by Michael Paramo published in Aze that identifies other forms of attraction beyond sexual and romantic attraction, including aesthetic, emotional, intellectual, and sensual attraction, to argue that these forms of attraction should also be considered in interpersonal relationships. Paramo argued in a 2024 book that splitting attraction can influence people to re-imagine their relationships differently when forms of attraction are not placed in a hierarchy.

A 2022 study found that while there is some concordance between romantic orientation and sexual orientation, the two were not a complete match, suggesting that the experience of split attraction between romantic and sexual orientation exists in both asexual and non-asexual people. A 2023 study noted that there is, both within and external to the LGBTQ community, a general misunderstanding that different forms of attraction can exist concurrently.

== See also ==
- Aromanticism
- Asexuality
- Queerplatonic relationship
- Romantic orientation
- Sexual orientation
