= Gray aromanticism =

Experiencing romantic attraction rarely or only under certain circumstances

Greyromanticism, also called grey-aromanticism or simply greyaro, is an identity on the aromantic spectrum that refers to someone who experiences infrequent or context-dependent romantic attraction.
