= Tennessee House Bill 1111 =

2017 Tennessee law

House Bill 1111, officially called An act to amend Tennessee Code Annotated, Title 1, Chapter 3, relative to the construction of statutes, is a 2017 law in the state of Tennessee that added the following text: "undefined words shall be given their natural and ordinary meaning, without forced or subtle construction that would limit or extend the meaning of the language, except when a contrary intention is clearly manifest."

== Passage ==
On March 26, 2017, the Tennessee House of Representatives passed HB 1111, with 70 yeas and 23 nays. On April 27, 2017, the Tennessee Senate passed HB 1111, with 23 yeas, 6 nays, and 1 did not vote. On May 5, 2017, Governor Bill Haslam signed HB 1111 into law as Pub. Ch. 302.

== Reaction ==
The bill was sponsored by Andrew Farmer, a Republican member of the Tennessee House of Representatives and John Stevens, a Republican member of the Tennessee Senate. Both Farmer and Stevens said the bill did not target the LGBT community. However, David Fowler of the Family Action Council of Tennessee hoped the bill would force judges to define marriage as between a man and a woman. Meanwhile, the Human Rights Campaign said it was an attempt to challenge Obergefell v. Hodges. Additionally, the Tennessee Equality Project called it the "LGBT erasure bill". The Tennessee chapter of the American Civil Liberties Union called for the governor to veto the bill.

== See also ==
- Same-sex marriage in Tennessee
