= Aromantic flag =

Pride flag

- Use: Symbol of the aromantic community
- Proportion: 3:5
- Adopted: 2014
- Design: Five equally-sized horizontal bars; Dark green, light green, white, grey, black
- Designed by: Cameron Whimsy

The aromantic flag is a pride flag representing aromanticism, aromantic individuals and the aromantic community. The flag was designed by Cameron Whimsy in 2014.

== History and design ==
The first known version of the aromantic flag featured four stripes: green for aromanticism, yellow for friendship, orange for the spectrum between romance and aromanticism, and black for alloromantics. The origin of this flag is unknown.

Following some discussion on social media platform Tumblr on this initial flag, Cameron Whimsy designed a new flag in February 2014 featuring five stripes, citing lack of inclusivity of the meanings of the stripes of original flag. The new version featured five equally sized horizontal bars. The color of the stripes was dark green, light green, yellow, gray, and black stripes and the meanings described to represent people across the whole aromantic spectrum.

Following this version, Whimsy followed up with another slight redesign in November 2014 into its current version that has since been adopted widely by the aromantic community. The flag features five equally-sized horizontal bars. The main color, green, was chosen as it is the opposite of red, which is most commonly associated with romantic love. The two shades of green represent the aromantic spectrum, white represents platonic love and friendship, and grey and black represent the different parts of the sexuality spectrum.

Whimsy described the meaning of the stripes in further detail:

Green-light green - the aro-spectrum (and aromanticism itself represented by green because green belongs to us now hell yeah). this covers every identity under the aro umbrella - demi, grey, lith/akoi, wtf/quoiro, cupio etc. EVERYTHING. even ones that don’t have names yet.

White - basically the ‘platonic’ stripe - friendship/platonic and aesthetic attraction/queerplatonic relationships/family, the importance and validity of all non-romantic relationships and feelings and non-romantic forms of love etc. etc. etc. etc.

Black-grey - the sexuality spectrum - acknowledging aro-aces, aromantic allosexuals, and everything in between because we are a diverse lot.

Color shades
First design		Second design		Third design (current)	
Hex triplet	Color	Hex triplet	Color	Hex triplet	Color
#7DBE00	Green	#3AA640	Green	#3AA640	Green
#FFF300	Yellow	#A8D47A	Light green	#A8D47A	Light green
#FF7000	Orange	#FFFF80	Yellow	#FFFFFF	White
#000000	Black	#AAABAB	Grey	#AAABAB	Grey
		#000000	Black	#000000	Black

== Gallery ==
First aromantic flag, before February 2014

Second aromantic flag, February–November 2014

Current aromantic flag, November 2014–

== See also ==
- LGBT symbols
