= Loveless (novel) =

2020 young adult novel by Alice Oseman

- First edition cover
- Author: Alice Oseman
- Language: English
- Genre: Young adult fiction
- Publisher: HarperCollins Children's Books (paperback), Scholastic (hardcover)
- Publication date: 9 July 2020
- Publication place: United Kingdom
- Media type: Print (paperback, hardcover)
- Pages: 433 (paperback); 432 (hardcover)
- ISBN: 978-0-00-824412-5 (HarperCollins paperback edition)

Loveless is a novel written by Alice Oseman. Published by HarperCollins Children's Books on 9 July 2020, the novel follows Georgia as she begins university. Depicting her journey of self-discovery as an asexual and aromantic individual, the novel received positive reception from literary reviewers and media outlets.

== Plot ==
Loveless follows 18-year-old Georgia Warr, a girl entering her first year at Durham University having never kissed anyone or held a crush before. Despite never having those experiences, she is passionate about reading fanfics. Hoping her first year will help her discover romantic feelings, she begins to ponder why these feelings elude her, leading her on a journey of self-discovery. Georgia is also "wary of the dramatic reality of new love, which promptly wreaks chaos on her platonic friendships."

== Development and release ==
Oseman previously authored Heartstopper, a young adult graphic novel series based on her 2016 webcomic of the same name. She commented on her inspiration for Loveless, expressing her "desire to write a story about the power of platonic love," and elaborated that her prior works explored the idea, "but never as the main theme". Oseman herself is asexual (ace) and aromantic (aro), though has stated Loveless is "not an autobiographical book, but it does draw on a lot of experiences." In an interview with Pride, Oseman stated "I wanted to read a story that explored all the uncertainty, confusion, internalized phobias, and path to self-acceptance that I've read lots about in gay coming-out stories, but never had with an aro or ace protagonist". The book lists the Asexual Visibility and Education Network (AVEN) and Aze as educational resources.

Loveless was published as a paperback by HarperCollins in the United Kingdom on 9 July 2020. Scholastic published the novel as a hardcover in the United States on 1 March 2022.

== Reception and accolades ==
Loveless received positive critical reception from literary reviewers and media outlet writers, with many praising the novel's depiction of an aro/ace individual. Some also added that Loveless helped them discover their own aromanticism, or helped them affirm their personal journeys with their aromantic or asexual identities. In February 2023, Jonny Yates of PinkNews wrote that the novel is "perhaps one of the most notable and popular books with aromantic characters".

Kirkus Reviews wrote that Loveless is "a messy, imperfect, and necessary portrayal of a drastically underrepresented identity." Ani Bundel of Paste recommended the novel, expressing that its depiction of an aro/ace individual in a romance is "a rare thing still, and the burgeoning world of LGBTQ+ love stories needs more of them." Writing for the UPRRP chapter of Her Campus, Zaidi Gonzalez also highly praised Loveless' depiction of an aro/ace individual. Gonzalez suggested that those questioning their sexuality strongly consider reading Loveless, calling it a "fantastic book to read about queerness in general."

Commercially, Loveless had sold 7,274 copies by May 2021 through Nielsen Bookscan with that figure excluding sales in lockdown weeks.

The novel received the YA Book Prize in 2021.
