= Pragati Singh =

Indian doctor and public health activist

- Citizenship: India
- Education: Maulana Azad Medical College
- Occupations: Asexual activist, public health professional
- Website: drpragatisingh.com

Pragati Singh is an Indian doctor, public health official, and activist. She is known for her work in the Indian asexual community and research on the topic. She featured on the BBC's 2019 list of 100 inspiring and influential women from around the world.

== Early life and education ==
Singh grew up in Delhi. She graduated with a Bachelor of Medicine, Bachelor of Surgery from Maulana Azad Medical College in 2011.

== Career ==
Singh is a medical doctor and has worked as a public health professional in the fields of maternal, child, and reproductive health in India. She has worked for organisations such as International SOS and the World Health Organization.

In 2014, Singh found that there were no present communities online for Indians who identify as asexual. As a result of this, she founded the self/non funded group 'Indian Aces' on Facebook, gaining a community of 3000+ members as time passed.

In 2017, Singh launched the friend-finding service 'Platonicity', a Google form initially ran through Facebook like Indian Aces, with a goal to one day become a mobile app. The purpose was to have a platform that matches people looking for a non-sexual relationship. It was inspired by frequent messages online by those who needed help with finding relationships, and others whose family were forcing them to get married. It surveyed a large range of factors from an individual's gradient of sexuality to their political stances. Due to the rapid increase of interest towards the form with over 300 entries from multiple countries in two days, it was shut down to create a method that can accommodate more people. Since then she has hosted 'offline meetups' under the same name of Platonicity across Delhi, Bengaluru, and Mumbai, helping with speed dating and building communities. These communities help those who identify as asexual know that they are not alone. When it comes to payment, she runs it under pay what you can model.

In the same year, Singh's research study on asexuality was selected and presented at the World Association of Sexual Health Congress held in Prague. The findings of this study were then published in the Journal of Sexual Medicine.

As of 2019, Singh continues to run sexuality workshops, speed dating events, as well as group counseling sessions, raising awareness for and helping asexual communities. After extensive research, she has developed the "Comprehensive sexuality model". This model segregates sexuality into eight central components that form one sexual identity. Another of her future goals is to bring these workshops into medical colleges, to bring her subjects to the eyes of more doctors.

In a 2023 interview with Daniel Yo-Ling for Aze, Singh spoke to the differences in understanding asexuality as a sexual identity between the Western world and India, noting that "[as a sexual identity] in many context within India, it is less important," clarifying that "for my people, asexuality is not just about a flag, right? Or microidentities, or a label, it's not about that. It's about people literally making life and death decisions." Yet, Singh noted that the Western asexuality movement has access to more visibility and resources.

== Personal life ==
In 2014, Singh came across the term 'asexual' and immediately identified with it, and more specifically as gray asexual.
