= Aphobia =

Aphobia is a neologism that refers to discrimination against aromantic and asexual people, but may also more specifically refer to:

- Aphobia when it concerns discrimination against aromantic people—also referred to by the neologism arophobia (from aro as a clipped slang term for aromantic)
- Aphobia when it concerns discrimination against asexual people—also referred to by the neologism acephobia (from ace as a clipped slang term for asexual)

== See also ==
- Fearless
