= Communication Education =

- Discipline: Communication Studies
- Language: English

Publication details
- Former name: The Speech Teacher (1952 - 1975)
- History: 1952-present
- Publisher: Taylor & Francis on behalf of the National Communication Association (United States)
- Frequency: Quarterly

Standard abbreviations
- ISO 4: Commun. Educ.

Indexing
- ISSN: 0363-4523 (print); 1479-5795 (web)
- OCLC no.: 2076115

Links
- Journal homepage

Communication Education is a journal of the National Communication Association published by Taylor & Francis. It is a scholarly, peer-reviewed journal that publishes original research aimed at understanding the role of communication in teaching and learning across various spaces, structures, and interactions. The journal embraces a broad range of perspectives and methodologies, including quantitative, qualitative, and critical/textual approaches. All submissions must be methodologically sound and theoretically solid, contributing to the growth of knowledge in the fields of communication, teaching, and learning.

== Abstracting and indexing ==
The journal is abstracted and indexed in

- Australian Education Index (AEI)
- Children's Book Review Index
- Communication Abstracts
- Communication and Mass Media Complete
- Current Abstracts
- ERIC
- Education Index
- Education Research Index
- Educational Administration Abstracts
- Electronic Collections Online' Expanded Academic Index
- Film Literature Index
- Library, Information Science & Technology Abstracts
- Linguistics and Language Behavior Abstracts
- MLA International Bibliography
- National Database for Research into International Education (NDRI)
- OCLC
- Periodicals Index Online
- PsycINFO
- SCOPUS
