= Romantic orientation =

Classification of a person's romantic attraction towards others

Romantic orientation, also called affectional orientation, is the classification of the sex or gender which a person experiences romantic attraction towards or is likely to have a romantic relationship with. The term is used alongside the term "sexual orientation", as well as being used alternatively to it, based upon the perspective that sexual attraction is only a single component of a larger concept.

For example, a pansexual person—who may feel sexually attracted to people regardless of gender—might experience romantic attraction toward only women and feel romantic intimacy only with women.

For asexual people, romantic orientation is often considered a more useful measure of attraction than sexual orientation.

The relationship between sexual attraction and romantic attraction is still under debate.

Sexual and romantic attractions are often studied in conjunction. Even though studies of sexual and romantic spectrums are shedding light onto this under-researched subject, much is still not fully understood.

== Theoretical background ==
The origin of the concept of romantic attraction comes from a theory in psychology explaining the motivations behind human attraction. Scholars have proposed that the concepts of sexual attraction and romantic attraction are different due to evolutionary reasons. The purpose of sexual attraction is for breeding and reproduction, whereas the purpose of romantic attraction is for long-term bonding between partners. This concept helps explain why a person could feel romantic feelings for someone they do not find sexually attractive or sexual feelings towards someone they are not romantically attracted to.

Separating these two concepts has helped researchers better understand attraction in aromantic individuals.

== Romantic identities ==
People may or may not engage in purely emotional romantic relationships. The main identities relating to this are:

- Aromantic, meaning someone who experiences little to no romantic attraction (aromanticism).
  - For identities within the aromantic spectrum, see Aromantic spectrum.
- Alloromantic or zedromantic: Not aromantic (alloromanticism or zedromanticism).
  - Monoromantic: Romantic attraction towards person(s) of only one gender (monoromanticism).
    - Androromantic: Romantic attraction towards men or masculinity (androromanticism).
    - Gyneromantic or gynoromantic: Romantic attraction towards women or femininity (gyneromanticism or gynoromanticism).
    - Heteroromantic: Romantic attraction towards person(s) of the opposite gender (heteroromanticism).
    - Homoromantic: Romantic attraction towards person(s) of the same gender (homoromanticism).
  - Multiromantic or pluriromantic: Romantic attraction towards person(s) of multiple genders (multiromanticism or pluriromanticism).
    - Biromantic or ambiromantic: Romantic attraction towards two genders, or person(s) of the same and other genders (biromanticism or ambiromanticism). Sometimes used the same way as panromantic or multiromantic.
    - Panromantic or omniromantic: Romantic attraction towards person(s) regardless of gender or of any, every, and all genders (panromanticism or omniromanticism).
    - Polyromantic: Romantic attraction towards person(s) of various, but not all, genders (polyromanticism).
  - Skolioromantic or ceteroromantic: Romantic attraction towards genderqueer or non-binary person(s) (skolioromanticism or ceteroromanticism).
- Abroromantic: Fluid between romantic identities or in romantic attraction (abroromanticism). Not to be confused with aroflux.
- Pomoromantic: Rejecting preexisting romantic labels (pomoromanticism).

== Split attraction model ==
The split attraction model refers to the concept that sexual and romantic orientation are separate routes of attraction. It says that because they are separate from each other, they can be labeled separately and discussed as separate concepts. The split attraction model is often used by people in the asexual and aromantic communities. It can also be used by anyone who experiences sexual attraction and romantic attraction separately.

It is useful to help clarify different ways that people experience attraction.

== Relationship with sexual orientation and asexuality ==
The implications of the distinction between romantic and sexual orientations have not been fully recognized, nor have they been studied extensively. It is common for sources to describe sexual orientation as including components of both sexual and romantic (or romantic equivalent) attractions. Publications investigating the relationship between sexual orientation and romantic orientation are limited. Challenges in collecting information result from survey participants having difficulty identifying or distinguishing between sexual and romantic attractions.

Asexual individuals experience little to no sexual attraction (see gray asexuality); however, they may still experience romantic attraction. Lisa M. Diamond states that a person's romantic orientation can differ from whom the person is sexually attracted to. While there is limited research on the discordance between sexual attraction and romantic attraction in individuals, the possibility of fluidity and diversity in attractions have been progressively recognized. Researchers Bulmer and Izuma found that people who identify as aromantic often have more negative attitudes in relation to romance. While roughly 1% of the population identifies as asexual, 74% of those people reported having some form of romantic attraction.

A concept commonly used by people that experience discordant romantic and sexual attraction is the split attraction model, which tries to explain that romantic and sexual attractions are not exclusively tied together and is often used by people of the asexual and aromantic community to explain their differing romantic versus sexual orientations. The abbreviation aroace (or aro-ace) can be used for someone who is both aromantic ('aro') and asexual ('ace').

== Symbols and Flags ==
Aromantic pride flag

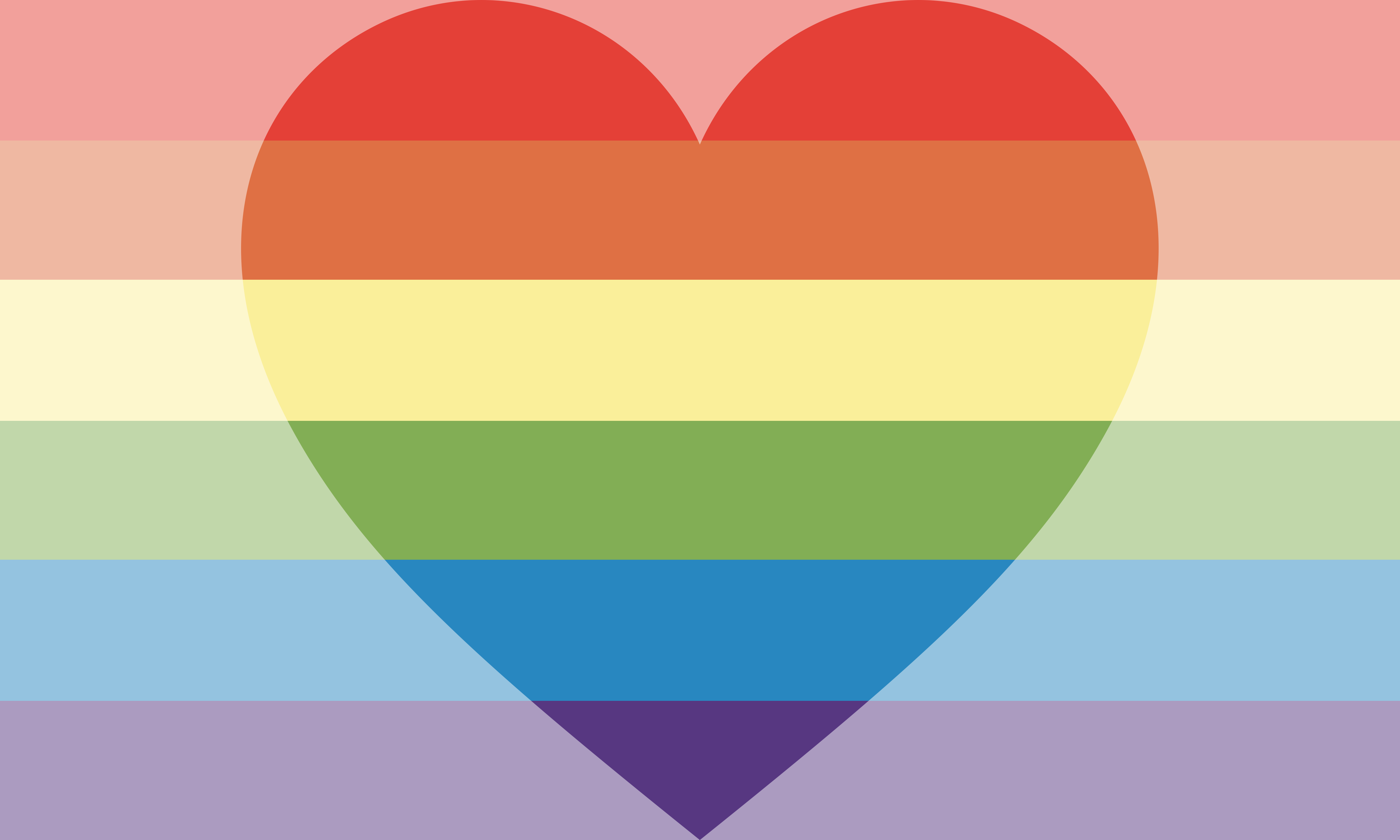
Homoromantic pride flag

Biromantic Asexual pride flag

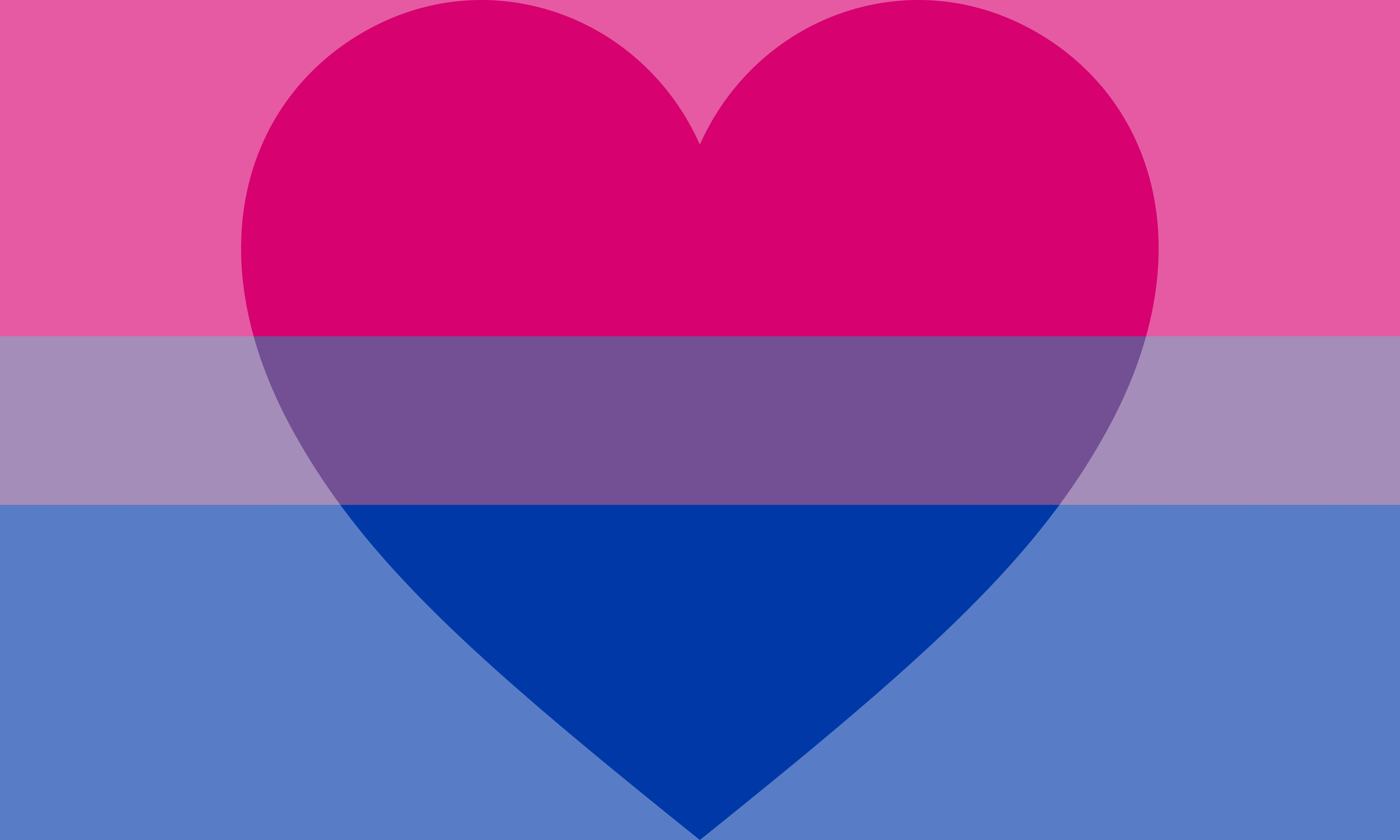
A proposal for a Biromantic pride flag

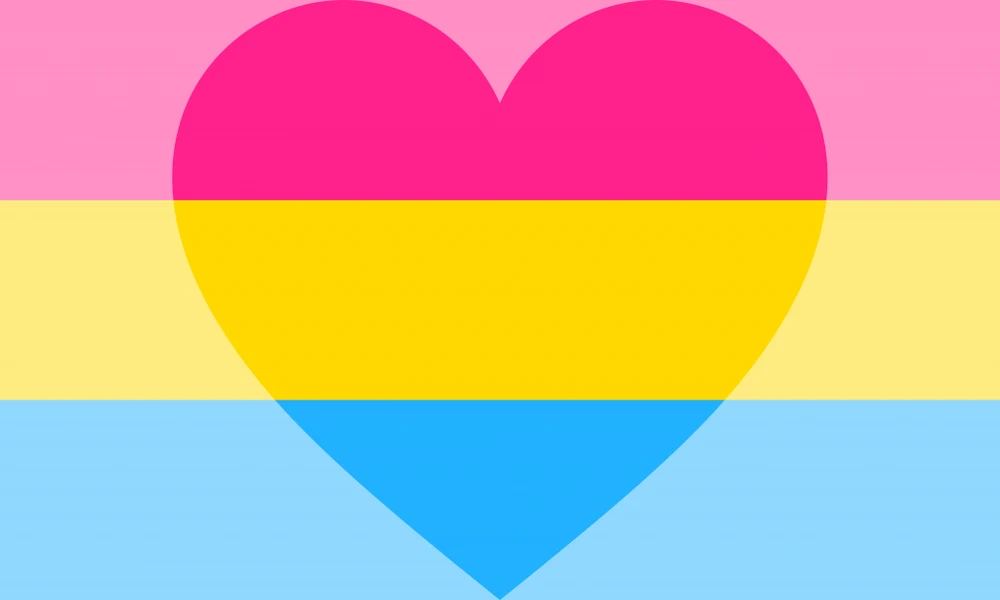
Panromantic pride flag

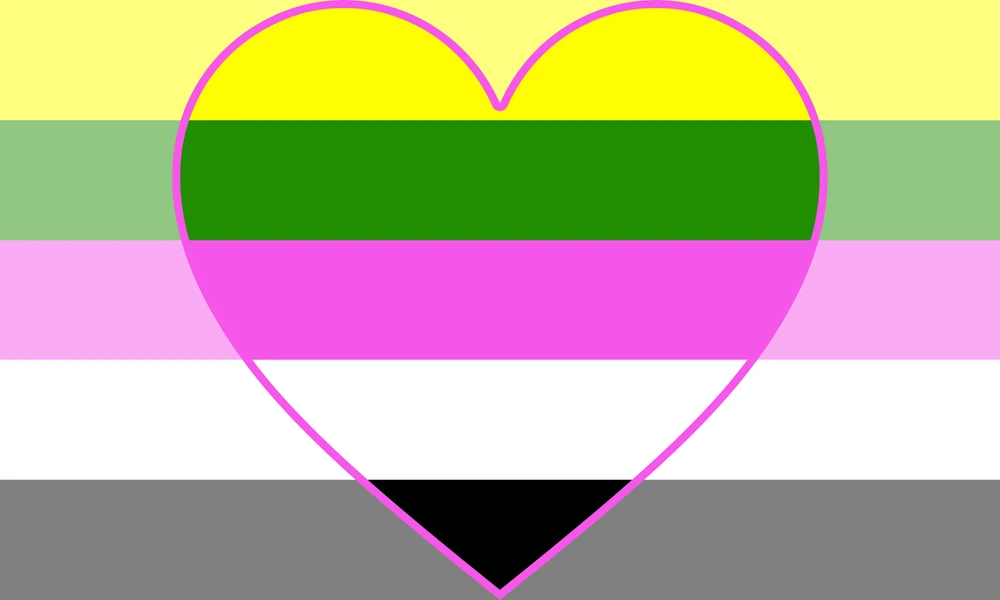
Ceteroromantic pride flag

== See also ==
- Bromance
- Cross-sex friendship
- Emotional affair
- Heterosociality
- Homosociality
- Queerplatonic relationship
- Romantic friendship
- Womance
