= Aromanticism =

Lack of or little romantic attraction to others

- Definition: Experiencing no romantic attraction to others; low or absent desire for romantic activity
- Abbreviations: aro

Flag
- Aromantic flag
- Flag name: Aromantic flag
- Meaning: Green for aromantic community, white for platonic love and friendship (including queerplatonic relationship), grey and black for sexuality spectrum

Aromanticism is a romantic orientation characterized by experiencing little to no romantic attraction. The term "aromantic", colloquially shortened to "aro", refers to a person whose romantic orientation is aromanticism. It is distinct from, though often confused with, asexuality, the lack of sexual attraction.

== Definition, identity and relationships ==
Simplified diagram of the aromantic and asexual spectrum

Aromanticism is defined as "having little or no romantic feeling towards others: experiencing little or no romantic desire or attraction". The term aromantic was added to the Oxford English Dictionary in 2018.

The opposite of aromanticism is alloromanticism, defined as a romantic orientation in which one experiences romantic love or romantic attraction to others. Some individuals who fall on the aromantic spectrum of identities describe themselves as having experienced romantic love or romantic attraction at some point. Such aromantics may adopt labels for more specific identities on the aromantic spectrum, such as "grayromantic" (romantic attraction rarely experienced or only weakly experienced) or "demiromantic" (only experiencing romantic attraction after a strong emotional bond has been formed with the target). As the experience of romantic attraction is subjective, some aromantic people may find it difficult to determine whether they experience romantic attraction. As such, those who are aromantic may have trouble distinguishing platonic affection from romantic affection.

Aromantic people may form non-romantic relationships of all types, and may be able to enjoy sexual relationships. They may also choose to have children, and studies indicate that aromantic individuals are no less likely to have children than alloromantic individuals. Aromanticism is independent of sexuality or libido, and while many aromantic people are asexual, many are also allosexual. Aromantic individuals who are allosexual are called aromantic allosexuals or aroallos. Due to this, aromantic people who are not asexual can also identify with other sexual orientations, such as "aromantic bisexual" or "aromantic heterosexual". This split between romantic and sexual orientation is commonly explained as the split attraction model, which states that romantic and sexual attraction are not strictly linked for all people. Aromantic asexual people are colloquially known as "aro-ace" or "aroace".

Aromantic individuals are also able to experience platonic love and may have committed friendships, and some form intimate non-romantic partnerships called "queerplatonic relationships". Aromantic individuals may enter romantic relationships despite not feeling romantic attraction, and others under the aromantic spectrum such as those who identify as demiromantic may enter romantic relationships under limited circumstances. Individuals who do not experience platonic attraction are named as aplatonic. Aromantic individuals are also able to experience sensual attraction. Those who do not experience sensual attraction are called asensual. Of those who responded to the Aromantic Census 2020, 14.6% had been in a non-romantic partnership.

Some have argued that aromanticism is under-represented, under-researched, and frequently misunderstood.

In society at large, aromantic people are often stigmatized and stereotyped as being afraid of intimacy, heartless, or deluded. Amatonormativity, a neologism coined by philosopher and professor Elizabeth Brake, is defined as "the widespread assumption that everyone is better off in an exclusive, romantic, long-term coupled relationship, and that everyone is seeking such a relationship", can be particularly damaging to aromantics. Amatonormativity is said to be connected to devaluing familial, platonic, and queerplatonic friendships/relationships, and damaging to aromantics.

In the initialism LGBTQIA+, the A stands for aromanticism, alongside asexuality and agender.

=== Identities on the aromantic spectrum ===
As aromanticism exists as a spectrum, commonly referred to as the aromantic spectrum, there are varying identities or labels that people on the aromantic spectrum identify with.

- Aromantic – someone who experiences little to no romantic attraction.
- Grayromantic – someone who may be experiencing romantic attraction rarely, only under certain circumstances, or only weakly. Also known in the past as quasiromantic.
- Demiromantic – someone who experiences romantic attraction but only after forming a close non-romantic bond with the person.
- Desinoromantic – an aromantic who experiences a crush for another person, but feelings never progress into romantic love; sometimes described as “liking” someone instead of “loving” them.
- Aegoromantic – someone who has an affinity for the concept of romance, but does not want to be involved.
- Lithromantic – someone who experiences romantic attraction, but does not want it to be reciprocated and may lose that attraction if it is reciprocated.
- Recipromantic – someone who experiences romantic attraction, but only after they know the other person is romantically attracted to them.
- Bellusromantic – someone who has an interest in, is okay with or enjoys traditionally romantic things, such as kissing or cuddling, but does not want a romantic relationship.
- Cupioromantic – someone who does not experience romantic attraction, but desires a romantic relationship.
- Aroflux – someone who experiences their romantic attraction to be shifting on the aromantic spectrum.
- Frayromantic – someone who only experiences romantic attraction towards people they do not know and may lose romantic attraction towards them if they form a deeper connection with them.
- Quoiromantic – someone who is uncertain if they experience romantic attraction or cannot tell if their feelings are romantic, sexual or platonic in nature.
  - Idemromantic – categorizing relationships and feelings as romantic or platonic based on factors other than presence or lack of romantic attraction.
  - Platoniromantic – not able to distinguish between platonic or romantic feelings.
  - Nebularomantic – difficulty to distinguish between romantic attraction and platonic desire, as a result of being neurodivergent.
- Placioromantic – someone who feels little to no desire to receive romantic acts but has interest in performing them to someone else.
- Apothiromantic – someone who does not experience romantic attraction and feels repulsed by romance or averse to romantic activities.
- Requiesromantic – someone who does not experience romantic attraction because of emotional exhaustion.

Beyond the above listed commonly used terms that people on the aromantic spectrum may use to identify with, there are also a series of newer emerging terms that are not yet commonly used by the community.

== Community ==
One of the earliest uses of the modern term "aromantic" dates back to 2005. The early online community around aromanticism formed on the Asexual Visibility and Education Network (AVEN), an online community around asexuality, and social media platforms such as Tumblr.

Since then, a dedicated online community centered around aromanticism has formed online on Arocalypse.com as well as other social media platforms.

In order to gain wider acceptance and recognition, a volunteer-formed organization, the Aromantic-spectrum Union for Recognition, Education, and Advocacy (AUREA), was formed to increase recognition of and education on aromanticism and help people on the aromantic spectrum gain wider acceptance by the general public. AUREA is also the leading organizer of the annual Aromantic Spectrum Awareness Week held in February.

Another community organization, The Ace and Aro Advocacy Project (TAAAP), focuses on providing resources around both asexuality and aromanticism to the public. They do so by creating and hosting workshops, developing educational materials, and engaging in outreach within the LGBTQIA+ community and general public. The organization has also written a book titled Ace and Aro Journeys: A Guide to Embracing your Asexual or Aromantic Identity that was published in April 2023.

=== Symbols ===
The Aromantic Pride Flag was created in 2014 by Cameron Whimsy. The main color, green, was chosen as it is the opposite of red, which is most commonly associated with romantic love. The two shades of green represent the aromantic spectrum, white represents platonic love and friendship, and grey and black represent the different parts of the sexuality spectrum.

A white ring may be worn on one's left middle finger to indicate one's identity on the aromantic spectrum. This was chosen as the opposite of the ace ring, which is a black ring worn on the right hand.

Another symbol often used by aromantic people are arrows, as the word arrow is a homophone to the shortened word "aro" used by aromantic people to refer to themselves.

The aromantic pride flag

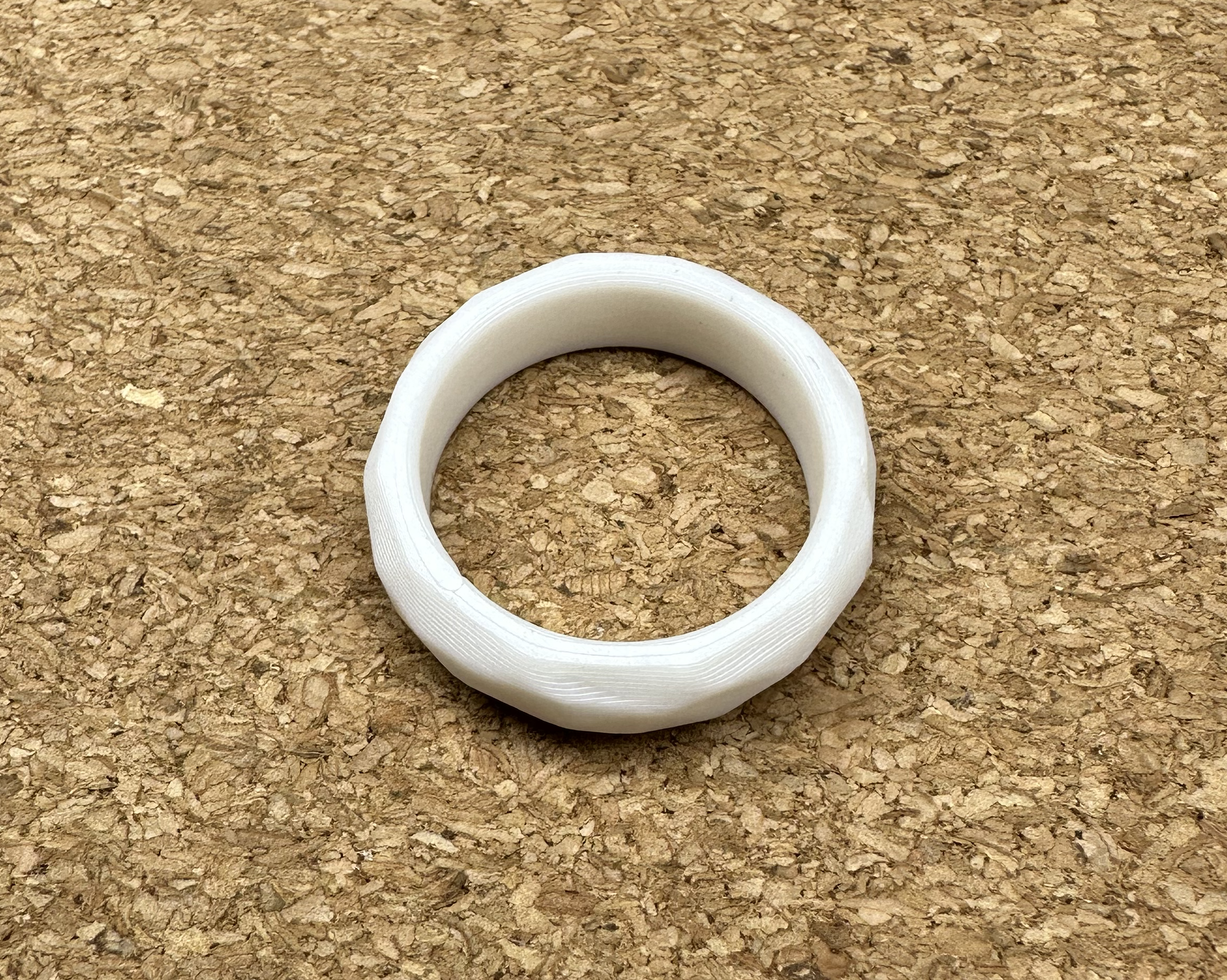
Aro ring, a white ring most commonly worn on the left middle finger

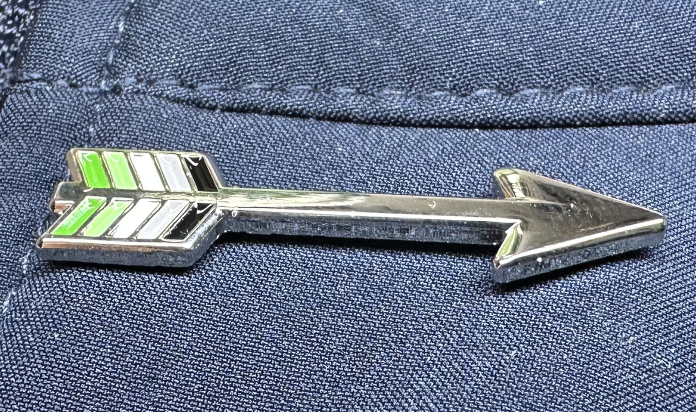
A pin depicting an arrow with the fletching representing the aromantic pride flag colors

=== Events ===
==== Aromantic Spectrum Awareness Week ====
Aromantic Spectrum Awareness Week (ASAW) is held annually during the first full week after Valentine's Day (beginning on Sunday). In 2025, it was observed from February 16–22.

The event was first recognized from November 10–17, 2014, and was subsequently moved to February in 2015 to be held the week after Valentine's Day. It is an awareness period that was created to celebrate, raise awareness of, and bring acceptance to aromantic spectrum identities and the issues people on the aromantic spectrum face. ASAW is led and organized by the Aromantic-spectrum Union for Recognition, Education, and Advocacy (AUREA) and members of the aromantic community.

ASAW has been officially recognized by a handful of states in the United States, including Washington State.

==== Aromantic Visibility Day ====
The first annual Aromantic Visibility Day was held on 5 June 2023. It was organized by a call to action on Twitter to give visibility to people on the aromantic spectrum using the Hashtag #AromanticVisibilityDay and spread across social media including Twitter, Instagram, Tumblr, Reddit and various online forums and a cover interview by Hello! magazine with aromantic-asexual author Alice Oseman.

== Cultural representation ==
Aromanticism is rarely depicted in media, but is slowly gaining more widespread acceptance and representation.

=== Books and literature ===
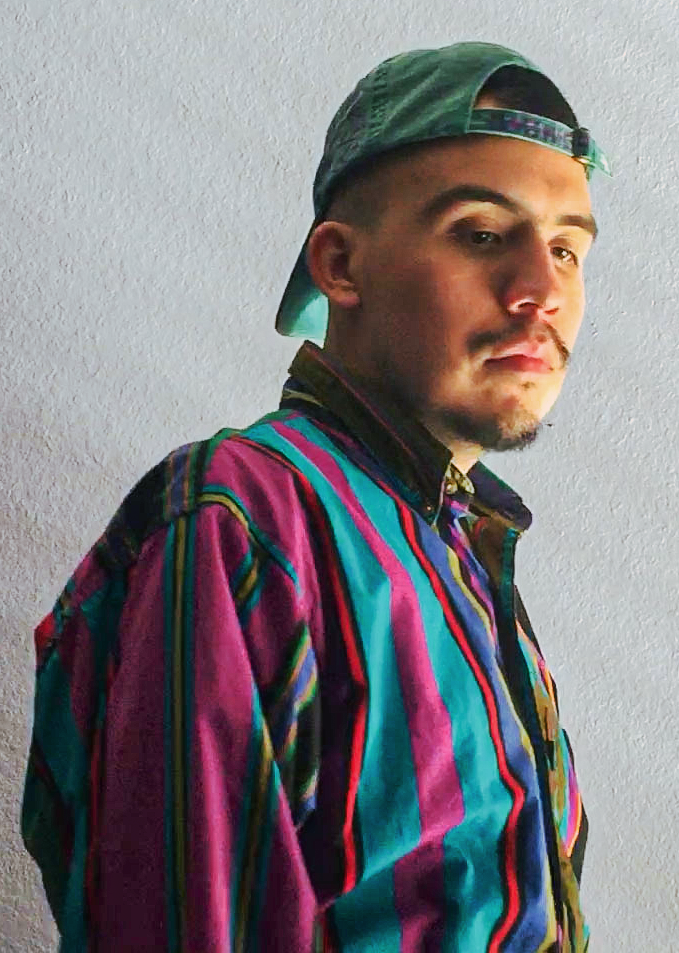
Michael Paramo was referred to as "one of the globe's leading aro academics" by ITV's Woo and published a non-fiction book on the subject in 2024.

As aromanticism is slowly becoming more widely recognized and accepted, additional literature about it is being published. TAAAP created a list of book recommendations as part of the Aromantic Spectrum Awareness Week 2022.

Some other famous aromantic writers are Alice Oseman and Darcie Little Badger. Oseman's young adult novel Loveless focuses on a college freshman as she learns about her aroace identity.

==== Non-fiction ====
A series of non-fiction books concerning aromanticism have been published since 2023:

- Sounds Fake But Okay: An Asexual and Aromantic Perspective on Love, Relationships, Sex, and Pretty Much Anything Else (February 2023)
- Ace and Aro Journeys: A Guide to Embracing Your Asexual or Aromantic Identity (April 2023)
- Hopeless Aromantic: An Affirmative Guide to Aromanticism (July 2023)
- Ending the Pursuit: Asexuality, Aromanticism, and Agender Identity (February 2024)

==== Journals ====
The interdisciplinary journal known as AZE, created by Michael Paramo in 2016, showcases the works and experiences of aromantic, asexual and agender people.

=== Online media ===
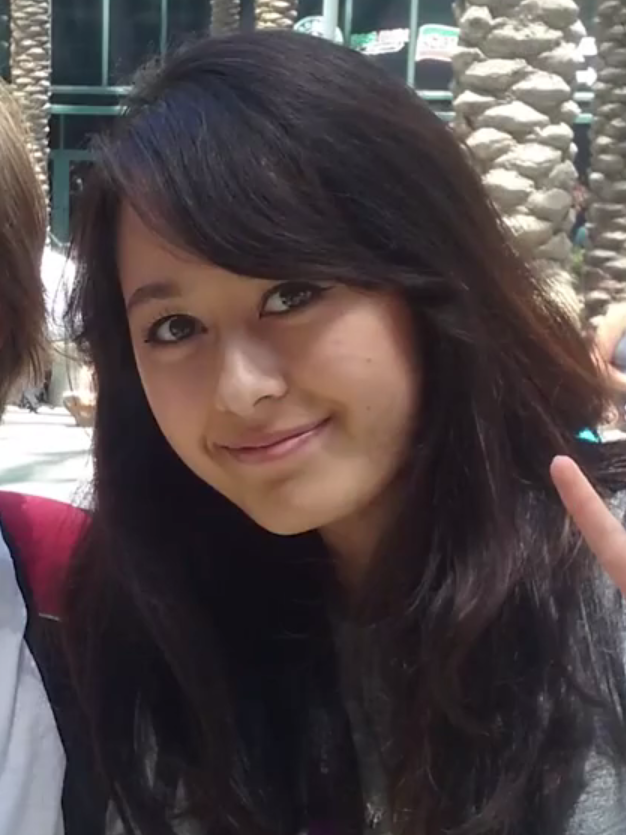
Popular YouTube animator Jaiden Dittfach published a video on coming out as aro-ace in 2022.

The podcast Sounds Fake but Okay by Sarah Costello and Kayla Kaszyca focuses on aromanticism and asexuality and has been credited with helping increase public representation of the aspec (aromantic and asexual) community and has won the 2020 Discover Pods Award for best LGBTQ+ Culture Podcast.

Popular YouTube animator Jaiden Dittfach published a video in March 2022, coming out as aromantic asexual, also known as aro-ace.

== Discrimination and cultural erasure ==
Discrimination, fear and prejudice against aromantic people, commonly referred to as "arophobia", or when directed at both aromantic and asexual people, "aphobia" is prevalent in both the general public as well as within the LGBTQ community.

Elizabeth Brake coined the term amatonormativity in the book Minimizing Marriage, meaning "the pressure or desire for monogamy, romance, and/or marriage". As aromanticism is directly counter to many western societal expectations, aromantic people face continued pressure and prejudice to conform to the "social norms" and form romantic relationships.

Although aromantics and asexuals have existed for as long as humans have, the terminology and openness has only gone mainstream in recent times.

Aromantic people are often left out of discussions and representations, including within the LGBTQIA+ community itself. This extends to some people's and media organizations' misuse of the expanded LGBTQ acronym itself, wherein some people mistakenly claim that A in LGBTQIA+ stands for ally. In actuality, the A in LGBTQIA+ represents aromanticism, asexuality and agender.

This erasure extends into modern TV media, including that of the character Jughead Jones, who is asexual and aromantic: in the 2017 television show Riverdale, the writers chose to depict Jughead as heterosexual despite pleas from both fans and Jughead actor Cole Sprouse to retain Jughead's asexual aromantic identity to allow the community to be represented.

Aromantic heterosexual men face the challenge of being labeled a womanizer by those ignorant of aromanticism. Sociologist Hannah Tessler writes:

Men who identify as aromantic and heterosexual must navigate how to approach relationships that would potentially involve sex without being perceived as a player or fuckboy. This involves conversations about their identity as aromantic in the early stages of dating, often before meeting up or getting involved with that person.

To counteract the stigma and discrimination against aromantic people, various community and health and wellness organizations have published articles and educational materials to educate the public. One of the misunderstandings about aromanticism is that it hinders one from living a fulfilling life. Academic Michael Paramo writes:

Aromantic people endure accusations that coming out is conceding to a life without love or purpose in the absence of romantic relationship formation. Romantic expectations are inherently connected to sexual expectations, since romance without sex (and vice versa) is not viewed as satisfactory enough toward achieving fulfilling relationships or a healthy life. Aromantic people have identified how this presumption can originate from the (hetero)romantic expectation that women should pursue their 'Prince Charming,' or a man who will 'complete' them, and that men should, to some extent, express some interest in forming a relationship with a woman (although with far less social pressure than women).

The English aromantic and asexual activist Yasmin Benoit called out that this erasure expands to official government offices, such as the Government Equalities Office not yet acknowledging aromanticism in their latest LGBT Survey and people having to label themselves under "other" instead.

It is worth noting that sometimes this erasure of aromantic identities even happens within the aspec community itself, with people equating aromanticism and asexuality even though many aromantic people do not identify as asexual.

In the Aromantic Census 2020, 82.43% of respondents reported not being taken seriously, being ignored, or being dismissed by others. 48.34% reported having experienced attempts or suggestions to "fix" or "cure" them. 70.51% of respondents indicated some impact of discrimination against their aromantic identity.

== Research ==
As the general term of aromanticism is still relatively young, studies on aromanticism in the scientific research field are still scarce and under-researched and of the few studies that exist, many treat aromanticism as a sub-set of asexuality.

In April 2023 two University of Toronto professors launched the Asexuality and Aromanticism Bibliography to better collect and track academic articles on asexuality and aromanticism.

The concept that there is a distinction between romantic and sexual orientation has not been studied extensively yet, but the diversity of attraction has been progressively recognized in newer studies.

A 2022 study on concordance between romantic orientation and sexual attitudes found that while there is some concordance between romantic orientation and sexual orientation, the two were not a complete match, suggesting that the experience of split attraction between romantic and sexual orientation exists both in allosexual as well in asexual people. The authors also note that they were surprised that out of their sample population, as compared to asexual participants, only few allosexual people self-identified as aromantic and hypothesize that this may be due to the unfamiliarity with the concept and term.

According to Debra Laino, an AASECT-certified clinical sexologist and relationship coach, one of the most common misconceptions around aromantic people is that they do not want to have sex. She explains that "aromantic people can still feel sexual attraction, but they might not identify with the way romance is often present in current media and culture."

A research article from 2021 discusses zines and their role within the aromantic and asexual community to help people navigate their identity and the authors note that aromanticism is "too often explored as a tag-on to asexuality".

=== Prevalence ===
The representation of aromantic people within the general population is not yet well understood. Of the population of asexual people, which is believed to be approximately 1% of the general population, about 26% also identified as aromantic. There is however not much qualitative or quantitative research around how many allosexual people also identify as aromantic, thus making it hard to say how much of the general public identifies as aromantic.

One study of 414 American adults found that about 1% of participants indicated that they were not romantically attracted to either sex (i.e. aromantic). The study also found that about 10.6% of participants had discordant (different) romantic and sexual orientations.

One population-based survey of sexuality in Japan found that 1.6% of participants did not report either romantic attraction or sexual attraction and 0.8% of participants have sexual attraction but do not have romantic attraction.

=== Calls for more research on aromanticism ===
Aromanticism as its own term originated within the asexual community online, but newer research is acknowledging that romantic and sexual orientation are distinct, and attitudes towards recognition of this separation and difference are changing. A contributing factor to this is that many people have difficulty distinguishing between romantic and sexual attraction as they are intertwined for most people and that between 19% and 28% of asexual individuals do also identify as aromantic.

Calls for more research around aromanticism and asexuality are highlighted by a recent study centered on the thematic analysis of online communications within the aromantic and asexual community, which highlights that allonormativity is prevalent in the field of communication studies and needs to be combated in order to provide qualitative academic work around aromanticism and asexuality.

In January 2024, PRIDEnet, a project of Stanford University School of Medicine, published a report as a result of a series of research community listening sessions with members of the aromantic community held in 2023 in recognition of the need for more affirming research related to the aromantic community to "address the lack of information surrounding the social, mental, and physical health of aromantic people and help us understand the challenges faced by and the resilience of the aromantic community".

=== Community research ===
The Aromantic-spectrum Union for Recognition, Education, and Advocacy (AUREA) is supporting researchers interested in studying the field of aromanticism and hosts an archive of research on aromanticism. Some of the research listed is peer-reviewed, but the organization has also supported some community surveys.

A census was performed by AUREA in 2020 to gather information of the aromantic community. The census received 9,758 responses from aromantic people around the world. Of the respondents, a majority identified as asexual, but about a third of respondents did not identify as asexual, highlighting that aromanticism is not strictly a subset of asexuality and should not simply be categorized as such. The census authors acknowledged that the respondent participant pool was over-represented by people identifying as asexual as well as other geographic, demographic and linguistic skews as the census was only available in English and due to the predominantly online recruitment method. The organization is planning to repeat the census on a semi-annual basis, but has not yet released the 2022 census.

Another community survey was performed in 2021 within the aromantic community specifically targeting the allosexual aromantic community to highlight the existence of aromantic people that are not asexual. The survey had 647 responses; the majority of respondents identified as queer at 43% and only 8.8% as heterosexual.

== See also ==
- List of people on the aromantic spectrum
- List of fictional aromantic characters
- Platonic love
- Queerplatonic relationship
