= Yasmin Benoit =

English model, activist and writer (born 1996)

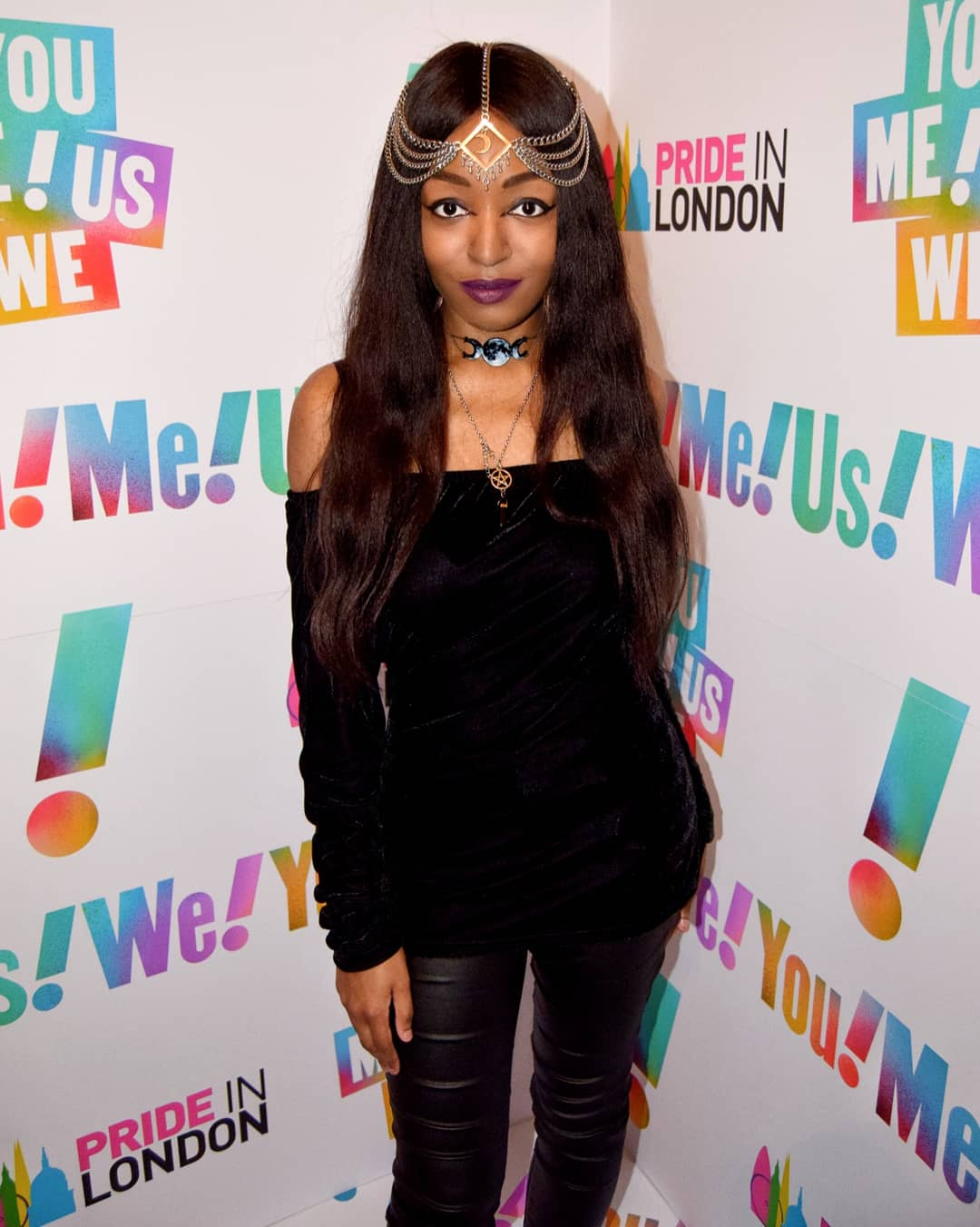
- Benoit in 2020
- Born: 10 June 1996 (age 30); Reading, Berkshire, England
- Education: St Mary's University, Twickenham (BSc); University College London (MSc)
- Occupation: Model
- Modeling information
- Hair color: Black
- Eye color: Brown

Yasmin Benoit (born 10 June 1996) is an English lingerie and alternative model. She is also an asexual and aromantic activist and researcher.

== Early life ==
Benoit is of Trinidadian, Jamaican, and Barbadian descent. She attended Reading Girls' School and Padworth College. At a young age, Benoit was not interested in anyone sexually or romantically. She chose to attend an all-girls school to avoid conversations about sexual intercourse and relationships. Benoit came across the term asexual in high school, but she did not identify with it until later in life.

Benoit has a Bachelor of Science in sociology from St Mary's University, Twickenham and a Master of Science in crime science from University College London.

== Career ==
=== Modeling ===
Benoit began modeling at age 16, focusing her efforts on alternative fashion. Her first modeling work was in 2015 with Scottish brand CRMC. She later modeled with Love Sick London, Dethkult Clothing, Seduced By Lilith, Kuki London, Pin Up Girl Clothing, and Teen Hearts. In March 2018, Benoit collaborated with African-American-owned gothic fashion brand, Gothic Lamb.

=== Activism ===
Benoit appeared in a BBC Three documentary on asexuality, but she was critical of the experience, claiming the way the documentary framed asexuality was a misrepresentation. She later appeared in a Sky News documentary on asexuality in February 2019. She has spoken publicly about work as an asexual lingerie model. This led her to found the hashtag #ThisIsWhatAsexualLooksLike in 2019. Her hashtag was noted to challenge the "white femme stereotype" of asexual representation.

Benoit wrote for publications including HuffPost UK and gave talks at events and universities, including the University of Cambridge, Reading Pride, King's College London, and National Student Pride. In collaboration with Asexual Visibility and Education Network (AVEN), Budweiser, and Revolt London, Benoit hosted the first asexual-themed bar at Pride in London in 2019. She joined the board of directors of AVEN that October. In a December 2019 issue of Attitude titled "The Activists", Benoit became the first openly asexual woman to appear on the cover of a UK magazine.

In early 2020, Benoit worked with England Unwrapped to interview asexual people. The episode was originally broadcast on BBC Radio Berkshire and later published on BBC Sounds. She co-founded International Asexuality Day (April 6) in 2021, and in 2022, launched an asexual rights initiative—known as the Stonewall x Yasmin Benoit Ace Project—in partnership with Stonewall.

In June 2023, Benoit became the first openly asexual person to be a grand marshal for the NYC Pride March. Benoit wrote that she received acephobic and racist comments in response.

Benoit was a consultant for the final season of Netflix's Sex Education. Following the release of the season, Benoit expressed disappointment that scenes involving an asexual character—especially those dealing with "the intersections of race, privilege, and acephobia"—had been cut or changed in editing.

=== Research ===
From 2025 to 2027, Benoit is a Visiting Research Fellow at King's College London's Policy Institute. In February 2025, she co-authored her first report with Michael Sanders on public attitudes towards asexuality in the UK.

== Recognition ==
In 2018, Aislin Magazine wrote, in "the predominantly White alternative branch of modeling, [Benoit has] become one of the UK's most prominent Black alternative models."

In 2021, Benoit was given an Attitude Pride Award. In 2022, Benoit was nominated for a British LGBT Award in the category of Online Influencer. In the same year, she was awarded Campaigner/Influencer of the Year by the Bank of London Rainbow Honours.

In 2025, Benoit won the "Outstanding Contribution to Communities" at the British LGBT Awards.

== Personal life ==
Benoit is asexual and aromantic. She came out in a video on YouTube in 2017.
