= Sexualities (journal) =

- Discipline: Gender studies
- Language: English
- Edited by: Feona Attwood, Travis S. K. Kong, Roisin Ryan-Flood

Publication details
- History: 1998-present
- Publisher: SAGE Publications
- Frequency: Bimonthly
- Impact factor: 1.53 (2017)

Standard abbreviations
- ISO 4: Sexualities

Indexing
- ISSN: 1363-4607 (print); 1461-7382 (web)
- OCLC no.: 474576878

Links
- Journal homepage; Online access; Online archive

Sexualities is a bimonthly peer-reviewed academic journal that covers the field of gender studies. The editors-in-chief are Feona Attwood, Travis S. K. Kong, and Roisin Ryan-Flood. It was established in 1998 and is published by SAGE Publications.

== Abstracting and indexing ==
The journal is abstracted and indexed in Scopus and the Social Sciences Citation Index. According to the Journal Citation Reports, the journal has a 2017 impact factor of 1.091.
