= Queerplatonic relationship =

Non-romantic intimate partnerships

A queerplatonic relationship (QPR), also known as queerplatonic partnership (QPP), is a committed intimate relationship between significant others whose relationship is not romantic in nature. A queerplatonic relationship differs from a close friendship by having a similar explicit commitment, status, and structure as a formal romantic relationship, and it differs from a romantic relationship by not involving feelings of romantic love.

The concept originates in aromantic and asexual spaces in the LGBTQ community.

Like romantic relationships, queerplatonic relationships are sometimes said to involve a deeper and more profound emotional connection than typical friendship. While this relationship structure is not dependent on romantic or sexual attraction, queerplatonic partners may still engage in behaviors which would otherwise typically be reserved for romantic partners.

== Definition ==
The Asexual Visibility and Education Network defines queerplatonic relationships as "non-romantic significant-other relationships of 'partner status'".

Angela Chen describes queerplatonic partnership as "one of the few explicit titles available to describe the social space between 'friend' and 'romantic partner'" for non-romantic partners who share the "intense relationship and the security of explicit validation" otherwise associated exclusively with romance.

Julie Sondra Decker writes that QPR often "looks indistinguishable from romance when outside the equation", but should not be "assigned a romantic status if participants say it is not romantic". She also notes that observers can misread it as a typical close friendship in circumstances where overtly romantic gestures are socially expected. For Decker, the essence of queerplatonic attraction is its ambiguous position in relation to normative categories: she writes that QPR "is a platonic relationship, but it is 'queered' in some way—not friends, not romantic partners, but something else". Similarly, CJ DeLuzio Chasin characterises QPR as a "meta-category 'catch-all'" for "non-normative relationships" that are "not romantic relationships but which are also not adequately or properly described by 'friendship'".

Some authors put less stress on the partner-status structure or non-normative character of QPR and focus more on the idea that it represents a stronger emotional connection than conventional friendship. For instance, the College of William & Mary's neologism dictionary defines QPR as an "extremely close" relationship that is "beyond friendship" without being romantic, and sex therapist Stefani Goerlich in Psychology Today similarly describes QPRs as a "deeper commitment than friendship".

== Terminology ==
The term "queerplatonic" was coined in 2010 by the writers S.E. Smith and Kaz.

The form of attraction that is involved in queerplatonic relationships has been described using the word "alterous". Alternatively, other sources have used the word "queerplatonic" to describe a form of attraction as well as a category of relationship.

In asexual and aromantic online spaces, queerplatonic partners are sometimes called "zucchinis". LGBTQ news website PinkNews describes this as "a joke which refers to the lack of terminology to describe meaningful relationships outside of romantic or sexual partnerships". A platonic crush is called a "squish", and this term has been applied to QPR.

== Origins and use ==
The term originates in the aromantic and asexual communities, and it was largely restricted to these spaces in the 2010s. The Huffington Post described it in 2014 as a "new label" coming from the same place as "aromantic" and "demisexual", the College of William & Mary's neologism dictionary observed in 2016 that it was only used in aromantic and asexual spaces, and Zach Schudson and Sari van Anders characterised it in 2019 as one of several "emergent gender and sexual identity discourses" appearing on LGBTQ social networking sites.

However, from 2021, some popular websites aimed at general audiences began to discuss the concept, and the concept has been used (rather than merely discussed as a neologism) in some academic art and literature criticism.

Some authors observed in the 2020s that QPR is associated with polyamory. A 2021 qualitative analysis of the language used by people involved in polyamory gave the word "queerplatonic" as a typical example of the "complex" vocabulary often used by individuals involved in consensual non-monogamous relationships. Y. Gavriel Ansara, writing for an audience of relationship counsellors, also observes that the term is common among polyamorous people. A 2022 article in the women's magazine Bustle drew parallels between "queerplatonic life partnerships" and consensual non-monogamy, relating both to relationship anarchy and the shared principle that the participants "customize their commitments according to what the people in the relationship desire".

Schudson and van Anders (2019) and the 2022 Bustle article also assert that use of the term is driven by "young people", or Millennials and Generation Z.

Sex therapist Stefani Goerlich suggested in 2021 that the concept was inspired by Boston marriages—formalized romantic friendships between wealthy women in late nineteenth century New England. She also characterized QPRs as "an ancient practice made popular again", and suggests that Ruth and Naomi in the Hebrew Bible might have had "one of the earliest recorded QPRs".

== Social analysis ==
Savie Luce challenges the conventional queer reading of Mary Eleanor Wilkins Freeman's Two Friends, a story depicting a Boston marriage, which casts it in a "sexualized queer light" as depicting a sapphic relationship. She argues that through the lens of QPR and Ela Przybylo's concept of "asexual erotics", Freeman's protagonists can be read as erotic lesbian partners without the need to mischaracterise their relationship as sexual or romantic, which Luce regards as "erotonormative". She also presents QPR as a radical counter-narrative to the lesbian bed death trope, with asexuality "an additive quality rather than a deficit" in a queerplatonic partnership between women.

Many authors have seen the concept of QPR as a reaction against an amatonormative hierarchy in which romantic relationships are regarded as more important than friendships. The author of the William & Mary neologism dictionary's entry on QPR opines that the desire to designate a close platonic attachment as a significant other rather than a best friend only exists because of the normative expectation that an individual should prioritize their partner over their friends—for them, QPR is only distinguished from friendship because the latter is not "considered a valid replacement for romantic love".

Similarly, Roma De las Heras Gómez connects relationship anarchy's critique of the idea that a romantic relationship is necessary to "create a family that includes long-term partnership, cohabitation, joint economic responsibility, and potential child raising" to the folk categories used in "asexual communities and aromantic communities online", and though she does not directly mention QPR, she does use the phrase "queerplatonic relationships" as a keyword for the paper, suggesting that she sees QPR as similar to relationship-anarchist non-sexual cohabitation and co-parenting.

== See also ==
- Allonormativity – Concept asserting sexuality as the only social norm
- Best friends forever – Intense friendship
- Josephite marriage – Marriage between a man and woman who agree to celibacy
- Platonic love – Non-sexual love
