= LGBTQ emojis =

There are various LGBTQ-related emojis, including pride flags. Apple iOS 6 introduced gay and lesbian emojis in 2012. Some gender-inclusive and gender-neutral emojis were added in 2019 and 2020. The Unicode Consortium approved the transgender flag emoji in 2020. Apple added emojis of gay couples in 2021.

In 2015, Russian authorities opened an investigation into Apple over LGBTQ-related emojis. Indonesia banned gay emoji and stickers from messaging apps in 2016.

LGBTQ-related emojis include:

- Rainbow Flag emoji: 🏳️‍🌈 (Emoji 1.0 in 2015)
- Transgender Flag emoji: 🏳️‍⚧️ (Emoji 13.0 in 2020)
- Transgender Symbol emoji: ⚧️ (U+26A7, Emoji 13.0 in 2020)

== See also ==
- Gaysper – LGBTQ symbol
- LGBTQ symbols – Flags and symbols used by the LGBTQ community
- List of emojis
