= LGBTQ slogans =

Slogans that express support for LGBT people

LGBTQ slogans are catchphrases or slogans which express support for members of the lesbian, gay, bisexual, transgender and queer (LGBTQ) communities and LGBTQ rights.

== Slogans ==
Slogan	Notes
Armed gays don't get bashed	The slogan for the Pink Pistols organization.
Be bold, be proud, be gay	Anti-assimilationist and anti-capitalist slogan.
Be gay, do crime	An anti-authority and anti-capitalist slogan.
Cake/Garlic bread is better than sex	Slogan often used by the asexual community.
Don't say DeSantis!	Protest slogan against Ron DeSantis, the current Governor of Florida, who passed the Florida Parental Rights in Education Act, the original "don't say gay" bill.
Free Mom Hugs	Emotional support slogan made popular by Sara Cunningham of FreeMomHugs.org.
Gay by birth, fabulous by choice	Made popular by Birmingham City University LGBT Society
Gay Is Good	Coined by early gay activist Frank Kameny, modeled on the African American slogan "Black is beautiful".
Gay? There's nothing queer about it	This slogan is used in a TV-commercial about homosexuality in name of the Royal Dutch Football Association. It is a translation of the original Dutch pay-off "Homo? Boeit geen flikker" by Delight Agency, an advertising agency from Amsterdam.
Gays Bash Back	This slogan is often used by more militant gay people and implies self-defense against gay bashers.
Hey, hey! Ho, ho! Homophobia's got to go!	Used by National Organization for Women (NOW).
Hey, hey! Ho, ho! Ron DeSantis has got to go!	Protest slogan against Ron DeSantis, the current Governor of Florida, who passed the Florida Parental Rights in Education Act, the original "don't say gay" bill.
Let's get one thing straight, I'm not	Made popular by Rob, Bureau of matters concerning discrimination of The Hague area and mid-Holland, The Netherlands
Love Wins	The title of Rob Bell's 2011 book, which "addresses one of the most controversial issues of faith —hell and the afterlife— arguing, would a loving God send people to eternal torment forever?" The prominent Christian pastor also came out in support of Gay marriage in 2013. #LoveWins also became popular following the U. S. Supreme Court's decision to uphold same-sex marriage in June 2015.
Majority doesn't exist	This slogan was popularized by MAKEOUT in Belarus during the 2016 opening of the "meta- queer festival".
Out of the Closets and into the Streets	This slogan was also used by Queer Nation.
Protect the Dolls	Slogan used in support of transgender women.
Protect trans kids	Slogan used in support of transgender youth.
Racist, sexist, anti-gay, Ron DeSantis go away!	Protest slogan against Ron DeSantis, the current Governor of Florida, who passed the Florida Parental Rights in Education Act, the original "don't say gay" bill.
Rainbows Reign	Used most notably on banners of the Pink Pistols organization.
Silence=Death/Action=Life	Designed by six people, including Avram Finkelstein, this slogan was used by ACT UP to draw attention to the AIDS crisis in America. It was often used in conjunction with a right-side up pink triangle.
Sorry girls, I suck dick	Used on shirts by the Swedish magazine and Internet-community QX.
Sounds gay, I'm in	Used by the community.
Trans rights are human rights	Used by the community, origin unclear
Two, Four, Six, Eight! How Do You Know Your Kids Are Straight?	This slogan against heterosexism was also used by Queer Nation. Another variation is "One, Two, Three, Four! Open up the closet door! Five, Six, Seven, Eight! Don't assume your kids are straight!"
We say gay! / It's okay to say gay!	Protest slogan against the Florida Parental Rights in Education Act and other Anti-LGBT curriculum laws in the United States, which have been referred to by the media as "don't say gay" bills.
We're here, we're queer and we'd like to say hello!	A variation of the below used by Queer Nation during the 1992 opening of the "Queer Shopping Network".
We're here. We're queer. Get used to it	This slogan was popularized by Queer Nation.
Why be afraid to be enGayged	Brooks foundation

== See also ==
- Gay pride
- Pride parade
- LGBTQ symbols
