= David Spada =

American jewelry designer

- Born: December 5, 1961; New Britain, Connecticut
- Died: May 13, 1996 (aged 34); New York City
- Occupation: Jewelry designer
- Years active: 1984–1996
- Known for: Freedom Rings

David Spada (December 5, 1961 – May 13, 1996) was a jewelry designer in New York City in the 1980s and 1990s, and the creator and marketer of Freedom Rings.

== Early years and education ==
Spada was born in New Britain, Connecticut and grew up in Berlin, Connecticut. He attended Parsons School of Design in New York City, graduating around 1982. He began making jewelry as a student, and his works were recognized as early as 1984, when a piece made from orange rubber tubing was highlighted in the New York Times.

== Career ==
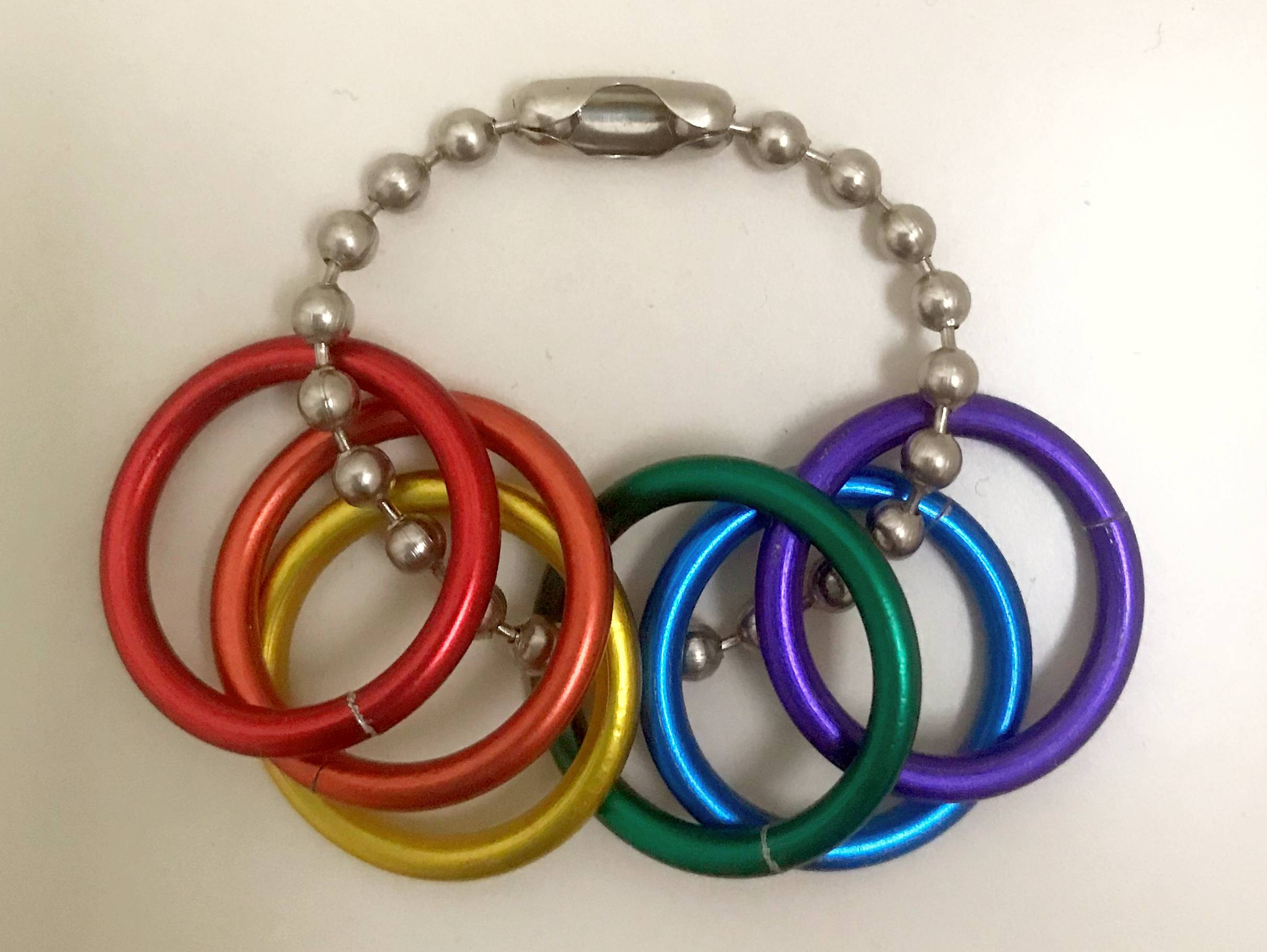
Freedom Rings on a keychain; Spada designed Freedom Rings

Spada opened a boutique, Casa di Spada, in New York's Lower East Side, which sold his jewelry designs, clothing and custom items; Spada's works were also sold through other outlets.

Independently and with his close friend Keith Haring, Spada designed and fabricated several costumes, headdresses and accessories for Grace Jones that were worn by her in performances. Some of these pieces are documented in photographs by Robert Mapplethorpe in which Jones's body was painted by Haring. Spada collaborated with designer Patrick Kelly on a jewelry line for Kelly's 1986 collection. He also worked with Kelly on one of the designer's most famous couture works, a 1986 Josephine Baker-inspired banana skirt and top originally modeled by Pat Cleveland, now in the collection of the Philadelphia Museum of Art.

In the 1990s, Spada's designs began to move beyond jewelry and accessories. He created large-scale hanging decorations over the staircase in New York City's Palladium nightclub that the New Yorker described as "lustrous David Spada stalactites." A decorative screen he designed is highlighted in a 1998 book on decorating.

In 1991, Spada designed Freedom Rings, which are six aluminum rings, each in one of the colors of the rainbow flag. These rings are worn by themselves or as part of necklaces, bracelets, and keychains. They are a symbol of gay pride, and were originally sold as a fundraiser for the 1991 San Francisco Gay Freedom Day Parade and quickly became a national trend. In June 1992, several of MTV's on-air hosts wore Freedom Rings in recognition of Pride Month, elevating their visibility. They are sometimes referred to as "Fruit Loops".

By mid-1992, Spada claimed to have sold 60,000 sets of Freedom Rings. Also in 1992, Freedom Rings were featured in the first gay-specific Absolut Vodka ad, entitled Absolut Spada.

== Death ==
Spada died of AIDS complications on May 13, 1996.

== Material and cultural impact ==
Spada became especially known for his work in colored anodized aluminum, crafting a wide array of forms from the material, ranging from rings and earrings to clothing and swimwear embellished with aluminum decoration.
