= Gaysper =

LGBTQ symbol

- First appearance: Vox official Twitter account
- Based on: Android 5.0 ghost emoji

In-universe information
- Affiliation: LGBT movement

Gaysper is an LGBTQ symbol based on the ghost emoji (U+1F47B 👻 GHOST) of Android 5.0. It is a modification of the original icon that uses a background with the colors of the rainbow flag. It became popular in Spain from April 2019 following a tweet posted on the official account of the populist far-right party Vox, after which a multitude of users belonging to the LGBT movement began to use it as a symbol. The icon has established itself as an example of the phenomenon of reappropriation of elements of the anti-LGBT discourse in contemporary society through social networks.

== Origin and popularization ==
On 28 April 2019, general elections were being held in Spain. The same day, the populist right-wing party Vox shared a controversial tweet in which it invited its voters to vote through the claim "Let the battle begin!". The message was accompanied by a photomontage of a scene from the film The Lord of the Rings: The Return of the King depicting Aragorn facing a crowd of orcs, whose figure had been modified and replaced with symbols contrary to the party's ideology: the feminist symbol, the hammer and sickle, the flag of the Second Spanish Republic and the Catalan independence estelada, several logos of media outlets such as El País or Cadena SER, the symbol of the raised fist, the symbol of the anti-fascist movement and, among them, a modified version of the ghost emoji (👻) of the Android 5.0 version with the colors of the LGBT flag.

The use of the symbol in the tweet met with an initial negative reaction from the LGBT community on Twitter. However, it would later end up using it for the creation of memes, and finally reappropriating it as a symbol of the community. The icon would be dubbed Gaysper, in a portmanteau of the word gay and Casper the Friendly Ghost; and subsequently spread in press and television. It was shared by popular figures of the Spanish media scene such as Mikel Iturriaga and Brays Efe, among others. According to an analysis of the social impact of Gaysper published in February 2021, the icon became the biggest topic of diffusion on the Internet in Spain on the day of its publication.

Warner Bros. Spain would respond to Vox's tweet by stating that the company had not authorized the party to use its copyrighted film images. On May 1, 2019, a representation of the icon would appear on an episode of the television program Late Motiv, in which he was "interviewed" by Andreu Buenafuente. His voice was represented by the deputy director of the program, Bob Pop.

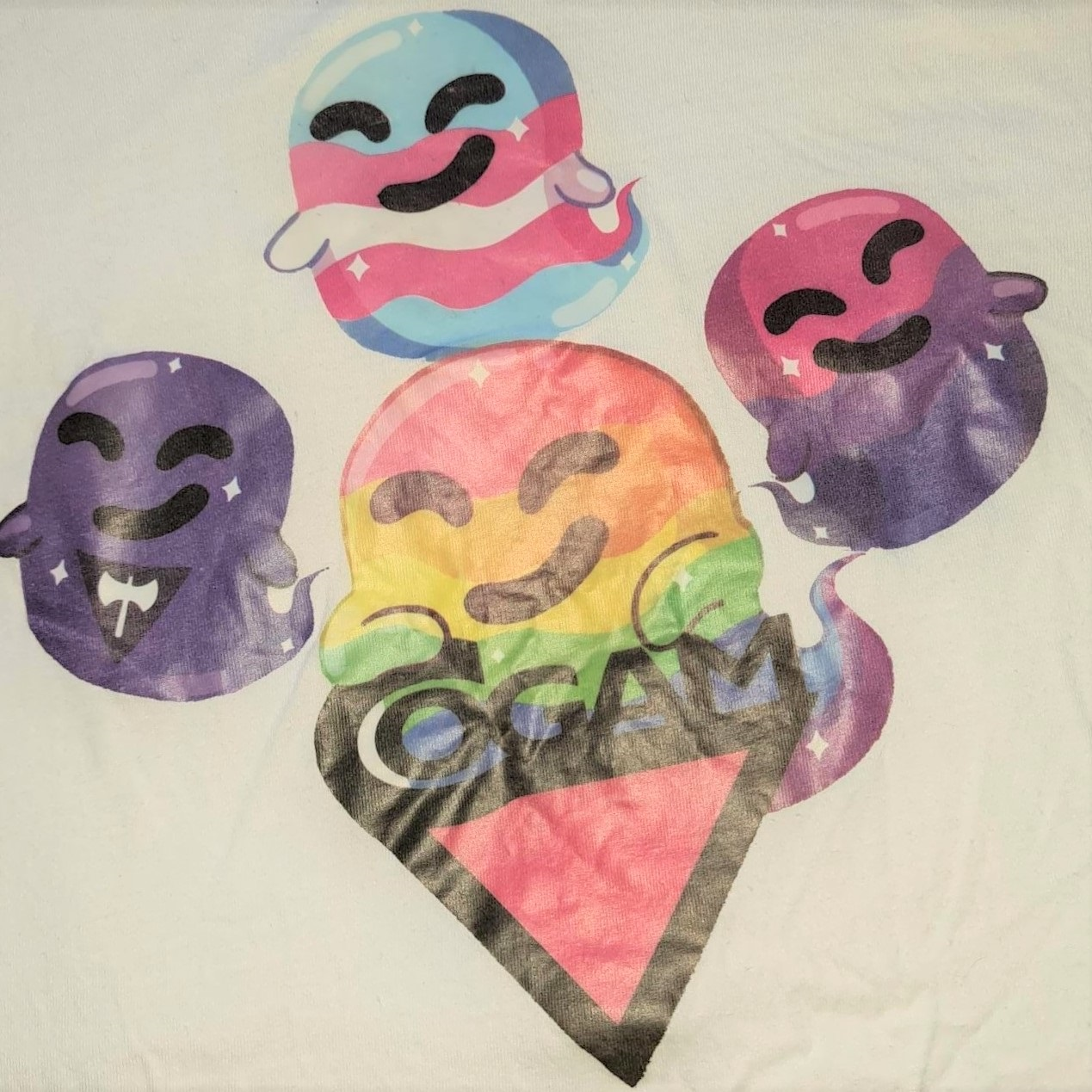
Versions of Gaysper on a t-shirt, involving a lesbian flag (left), a transgender flag (upper middle), a rainbow flag and COGAM symbol (lower middle), and a bisexual flag (right)

On May 21, 2019, PSOE deputies Felipe Sicilia and Arnau Ramírez would attend a parliamentary session in Congress wearing a T-shirt bearing the icon. Different merchandising items of the icon would become popular in the following months, on the occasion of the celebration of the International LGBT Pride Day. Likewise, versions derived from the symbol would become popular with other flags belonging to the community, such as the transgender or the bisexual flag.

== See also ==
- Pink triangle
- Pride flag
- LGBTQ emojis
- LGBT symbols
