= LGBTQ symbols =

Flags and symbols used by the LGBTQ community

Over the course of its history, the LGBTQ community has adopted certain symbols for self-identification to demonstrate unity, pride, shared values, and allegiance to one another. These symbols communicate ideas, concepts, and identity both within their communities and to mainstream culture. The two symbols most recognized internationally are the pink triangle and the rainbow flag.

== Letters and glyphs ==
=== Gender symbols ===
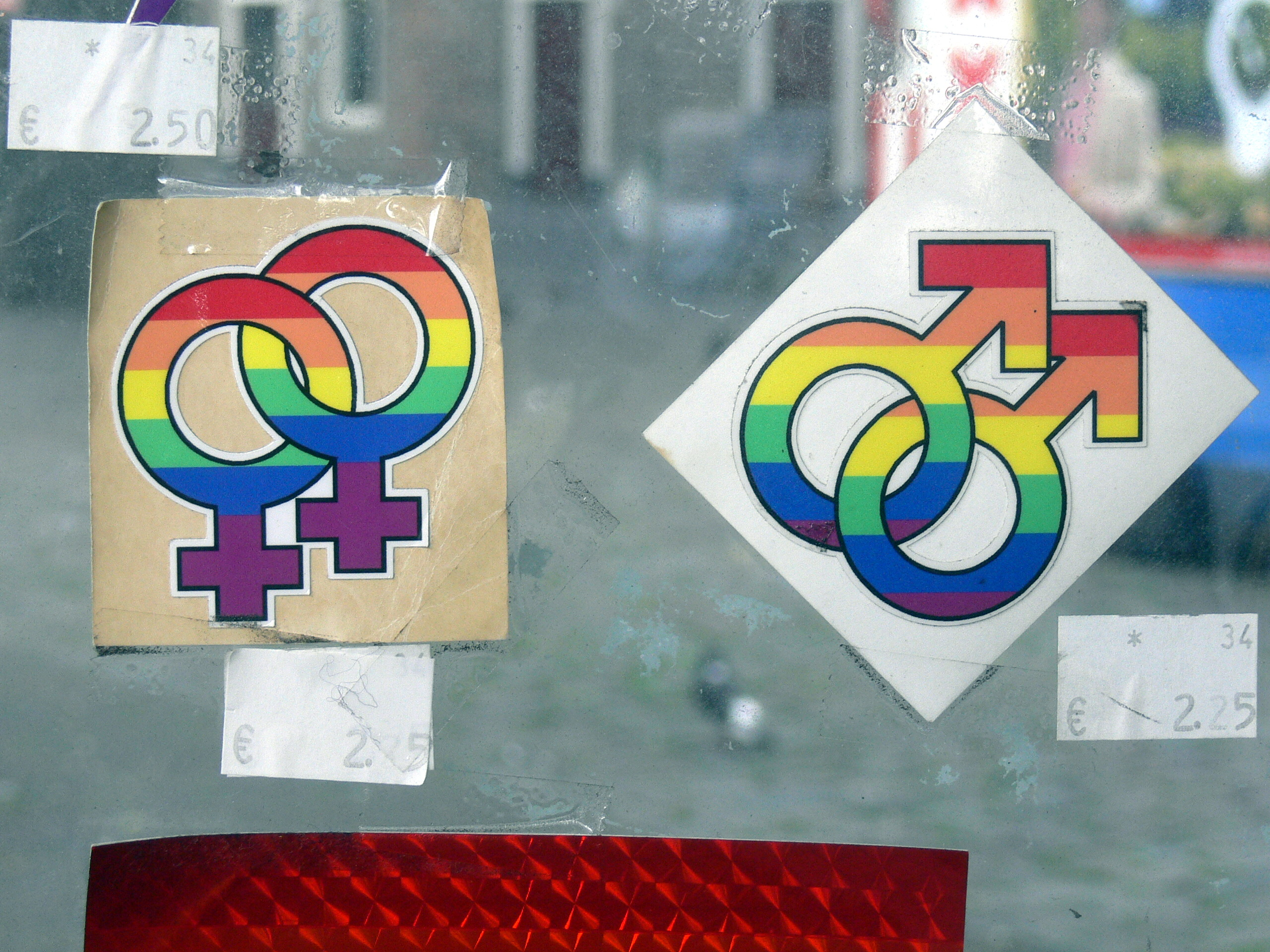
Lesbian and gay male interlocked gender sex symbols

The female and male gender symbols are derived from the astronomical symbols for the planets Venus and Mars respectively. Following Linnaeus, biologists use the planetary symbol for Venus to represent the female sex, and the planetary symbol for Mars to represent the male sex.

Two interlocking female symbols (⚢) represent a lesbian or the lesbian community, and two interlocking male symbols (⚣) a gay male or the gay male community. These symbols first appeared in the 1970s.

The combined male-female symbol (⚦) is used to represent androgyne or transgender people; when additionally combined with the female (♀) and male (♂) symbols (⚧) it indicates gender inclusivity, though it is also used as a transgender symbol.

=== Lambda ===
Lower-case lambda

In 1970, graphic designer Tom Doerr selected the lower-case Greek letter lambda (λ) to be the symbol of the New York chapter of the Gay Activists Alliance. The alliance's literature states that Doerr chose the symbol specifically for its denotative meaning in the context of chemistry and physics: "a complete exchange of energy–that moment or span of time witness to absolute activity".

The lambda became associated with gay liberation, and in December 1974, it was officially declared the international symbol for gay and lesbian rights by the International Gay Rights Congress in Edinburgh, Scotland. The gay rights organization Lambda Legal and the American Lambda Literary Foundation derive their names from this symbol.

=== Emojis ===
There are various LGBTQ-related emojis, including pride flags. Apple iOS 6 introduced gay and lesbian emojis in 2012. Some gender-inclusive and gender-neutral emojis were added in 2019 and 2020. The Unicode Consortium approved the transgender flag emoji in 2020. Apple added emojis of gay couples in 2021.

In 2015, Russian authorities opened an investigation into Apple over LGBTQ-related emojis. Indonesia banned gay emoji and stickers from messaging apps in 2016.

LGBTQ-related emojis include:

- Rainbow Flag emoji: 🏳️‍🌈 (Emoji 1.0 in 2015)
- Transgender Flag emoji: 🏳️‍⚧️ (Emoji 13.0 in 2020)
- Transgender Symbol emoji: ⚧️ (U+26A7, Emoji 13.0 in 2020)

== Plants ==
The color lavender and the eponymous plant are symbols of LGBTQ identity. This has led to the naming of terms such as the "Lavender Scare" and "lavender marriage".

In 19th-century England, green indicated homosexual affiliations, as popularized by homosexual author Oscar Wilde, who often wore a green carnation on his lapel, and used with the book The Green Carnation and Noël Coward's song, "We All Wear a Green Carnation" in his operetta, Bitter Sweet. According to some interpretations, American poet Walt Whitman used the sweet flag plant to represent homoerotic male love because of its phallic connotations.

The term bara (薔薇), "rose" in Japanese, has historically been used in Japan as a pejorative for men who love men, roughly equivalent to the English language term "pansy". Beginning in the 1960s, the term was reappropriated by Japanese gay media: notably with the 1961 anthology Ba-ra-kei: Ordeal by Roses, a collection of semi-nude photographs of homosexual writer Yukio Mishima by photographer Eikoh Hosoe, and later with Barazoku (薔薇族; lit. "rose tribe") in 1971, the first commercially produced gay magazine in Asia. The use of the rose as a prominent symbol of love between males is supposedly derived from the Greek myth of King Laius having affairs with boys under rose trees. Since the 2000s, bara has been used by non-Japanese audience as an umbrella term to describe a wide variety of Japanese and non-Japanese gay media featuring love and sex between masculine men. The rose is also the sacred flower of Eros, the Greek god of love and sex, and patron of love between men. Eros was responsible for the first rose to sprout on Earth, followed by every flower and herb. Roses are a symbol of pederasty in ancient Greece: handsome boys were metaphorically called roses by their male admirers in homoerotic poems such as those by Solon, Straton, Meleager, Rhianus, and Philostratos.

As opposed to the red rose and its association with romantic affection, giving someone a yellow rose is symbolic of platonic love. Because of this, yellow roses have also become popular as symbols of aromantic people.

Violets and their color became a special code used by lesbians and bisexual women. The symbolism of the flower derives from several fragments of poems by Sappho in which she describes a lover wearing garlands or a crown with violets. In 1926, the play La Prisonnière by Édouard Bourdet used a bouquet of violets to signify lesbian love. When the play became subject to censorship, many Parisian lesbians wore violets to demonstrate solidarity with its lesbian subject matter.

White lilies have been used since the Romantic era of Japanese literature to symbolize beauty and purity in women, and are a de facto symbol of the yuri genre (yuri (百合) translates literally to "lily"), which describes the portrayal of intimate love, sex, or emotional connections between women. The term Yurizoku (百合族; lit. "lily tribe") was coined in 1976 by Ito Bungaku, editor of the gay men's magazine Barazoku (see above), to refer to his female readers. While not all those women were lesbians, and it is unclear whether this was the first instance of the term yuri in this context, an association of yuri with lesbianism subsequently developed. In Korea and China, "lily" is used as a semantic loan from the Japanese usage to describe female-female romance media, where each use the direct translation of the term – baekhap (백합) in Korea and bǎihé (百合) in China.

In 1999, Michael Page established the use of the trillium flower as a symbol of bisexuality. This was a pun, as scientists had used the term "bisexual" to refer to the flower because such flowers have both male and female reproductive organs.

Sexual fluidity and abrosexuality—terms that refer to a changing sexual orientation that cannot always be consistently described—are represented by the watermelon. Because it is composed primarily of water, the watermelon symbolizes a sexuality that is fluid.

Because the word "orchid" comes from the Greek word for testicle, and the orchiectomy is a common surgery performed on intersex infants –especially those with androgen insensitivity syndrome– the orchid flower is a symbol of being intersex and of opposition to non-consensual genital surgery.

In 2022, oranges became popular with trans and nonbinary people starting in March with the release of the episode "This Is Happening" of LGBTQ-themed pirate comedy series Our Flag Means Death; oranges are a significant motif in the episode, in particular when nonbinary pirate Jim Jimenez (played by nonbinary actor Vico Ortiz) is revealed to have grown up on an orange grove. Then in April, Twitter user Antonia Terrazas tweeted a photo of an Old Navy shirt with oranges on a navy blue background with the caption, "Hot Transmasc Summer collection just dropped at Old Navy", causing the shirt to go viral. The phenomena converged when Ortiz purchased the shirt and posted a TikTok of them wearing it with matching boxer shorts.

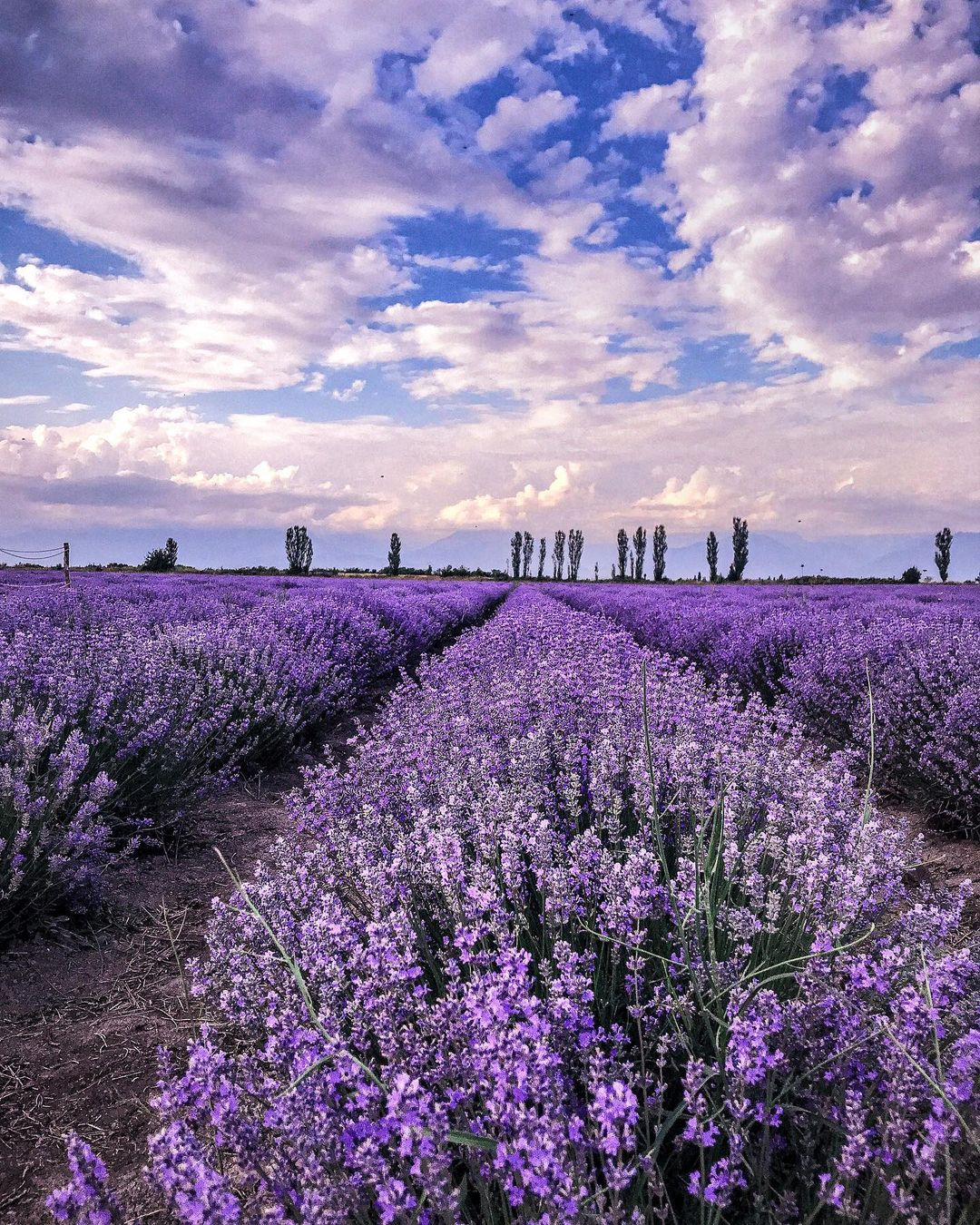
Blooming lavender; the color and the plant are symbols of LGBTQ identity.

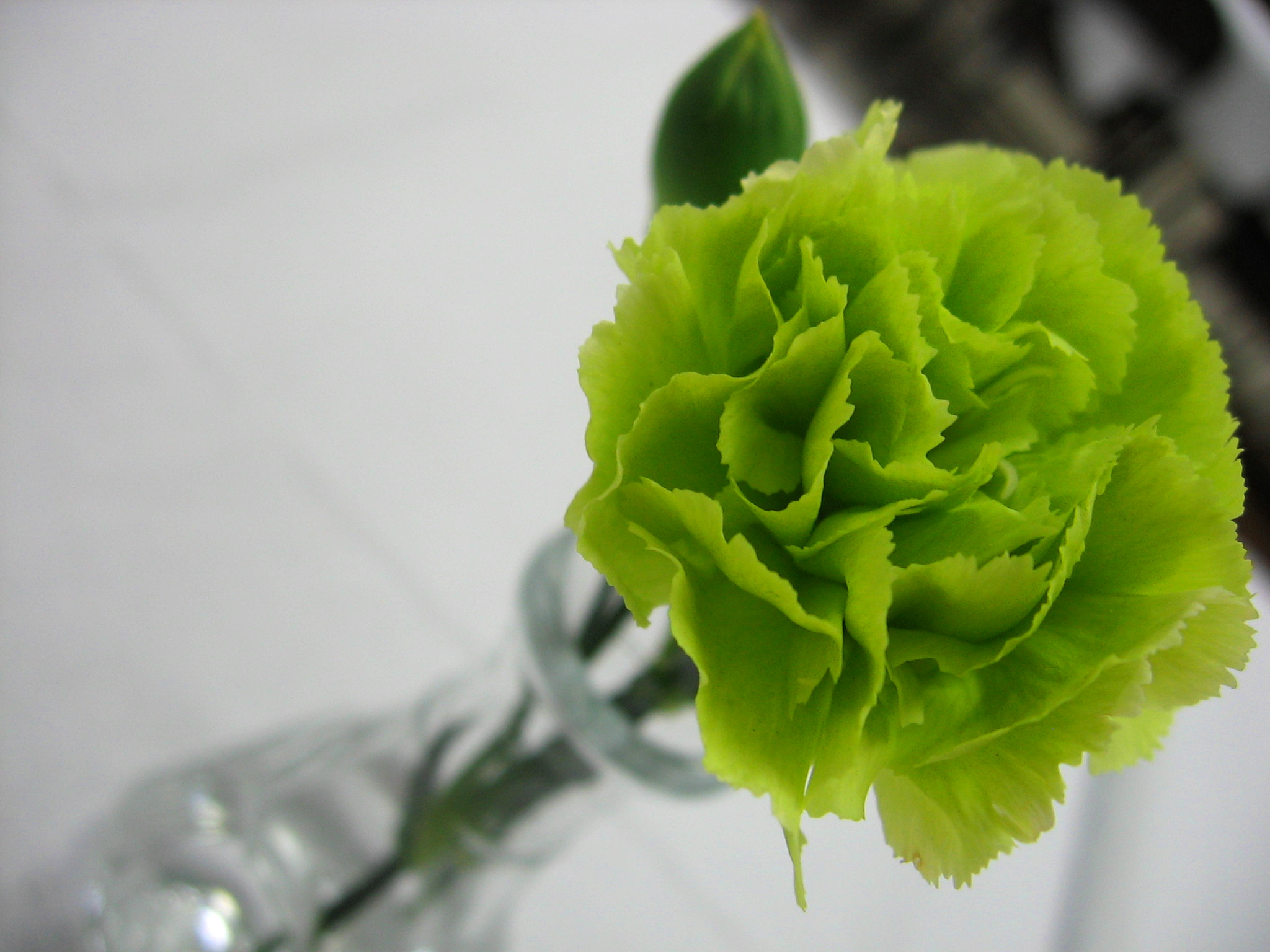
The green carnation is a symbol of homosexuality, popularized by Oscar Wilde.

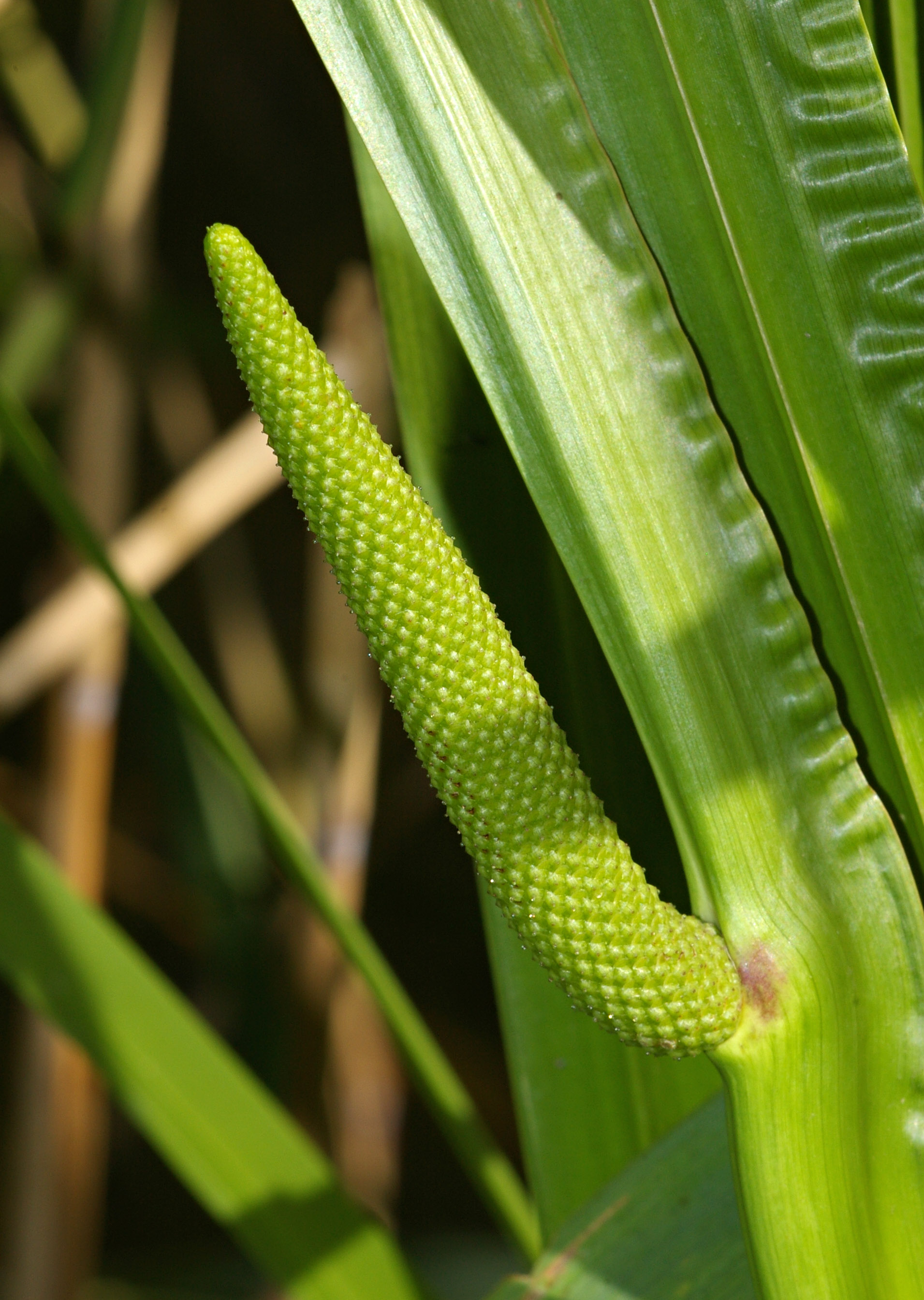
The sweet flag plant was possibly used by Walt Whitman to represent homoeroticism.

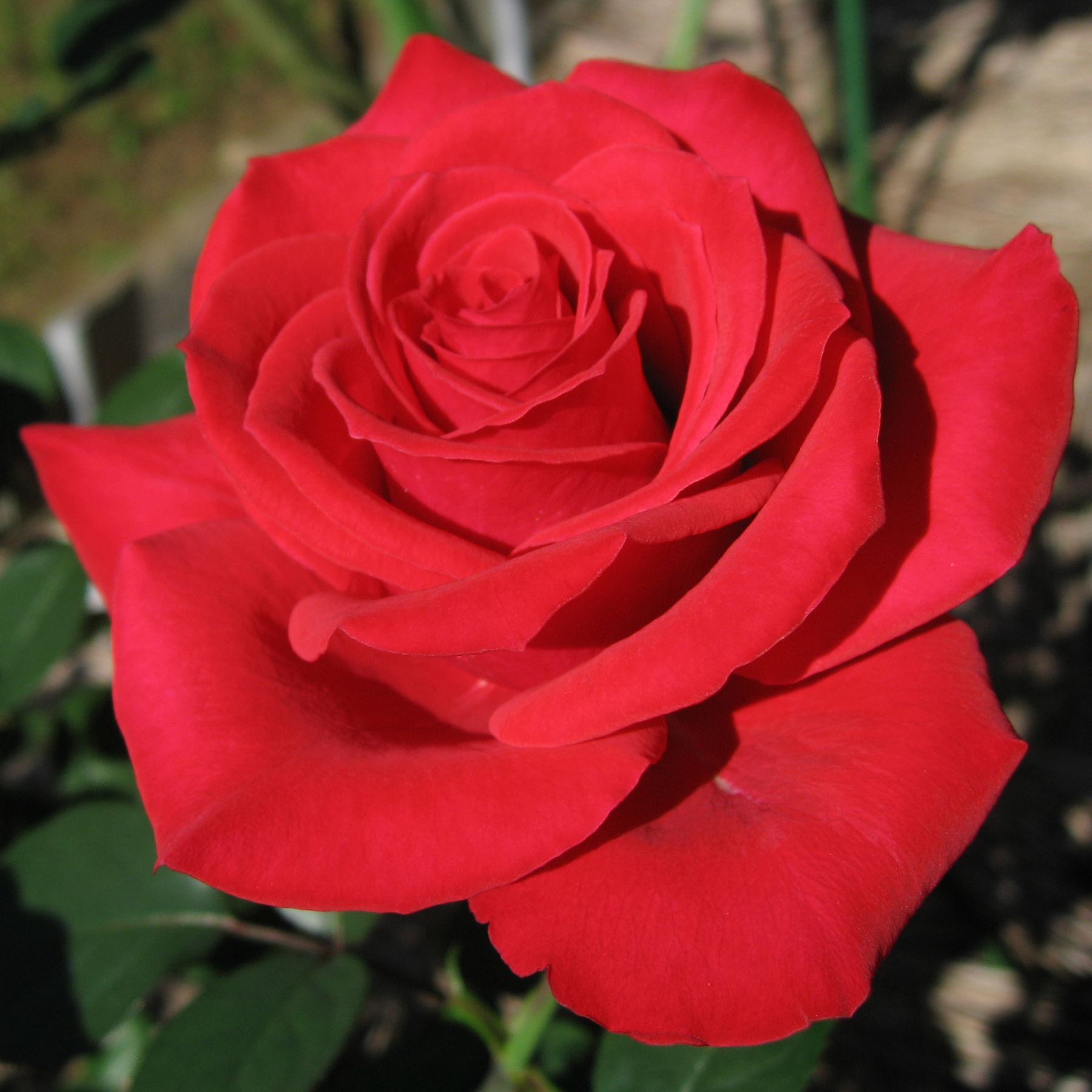
Roses have been associated with male love in both ancient Greece and modern Japan.

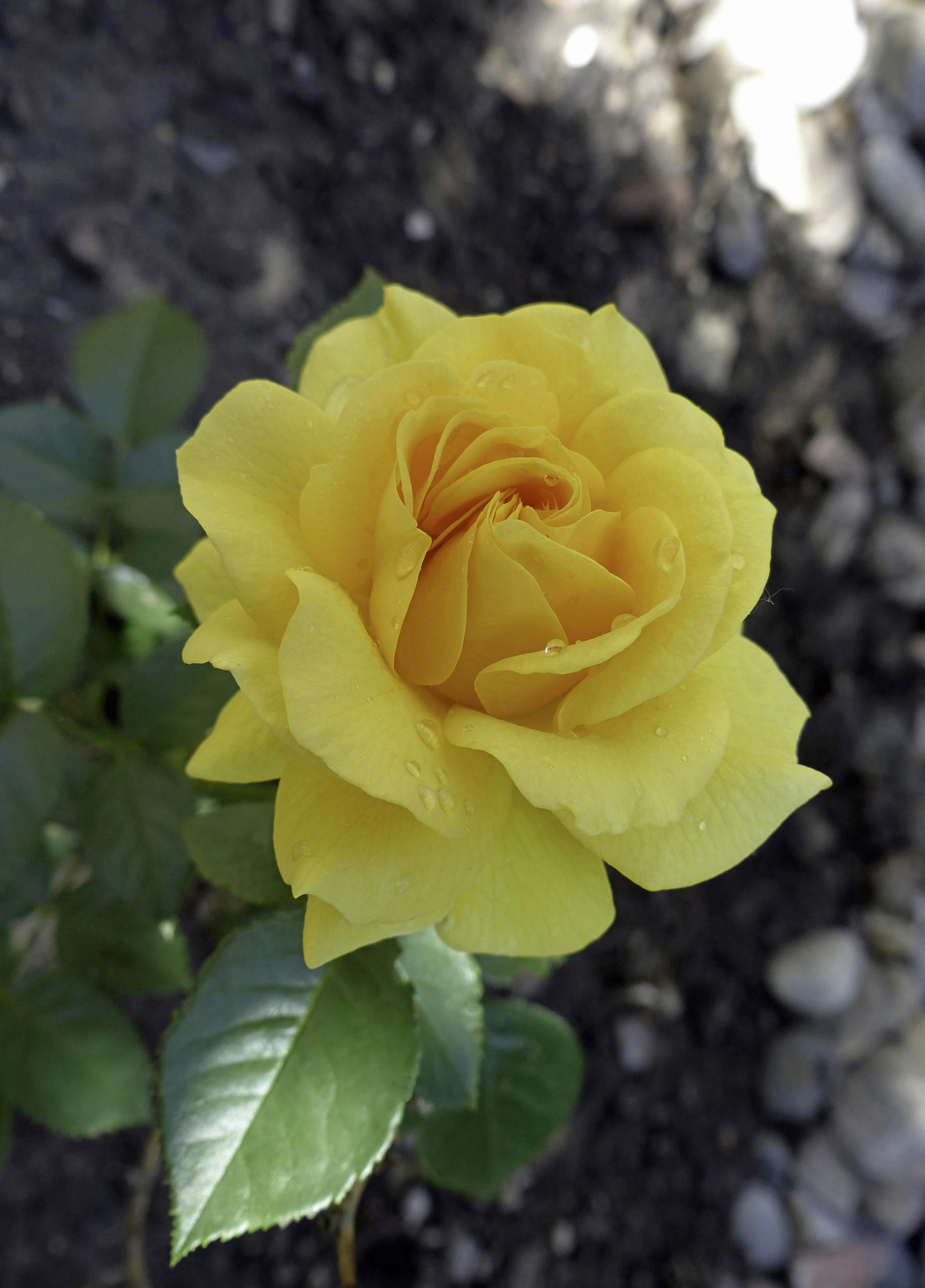
A yellow rose. Giving someone a yellow rose is symbolic of platonic love. Because of this, yellow roses have also become popular as symbols of aromantic people.

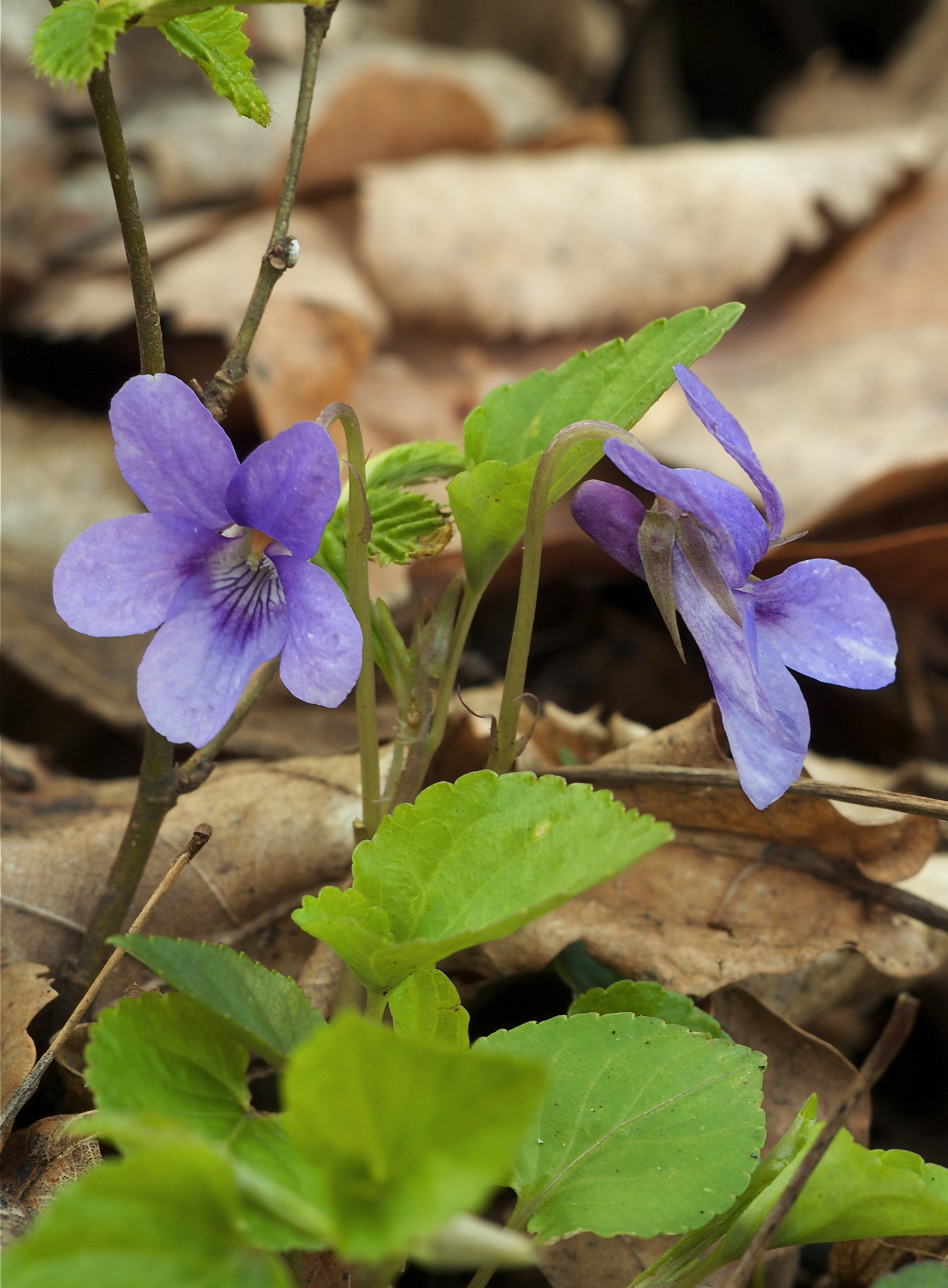
Violets, symbol of Sapphic love.

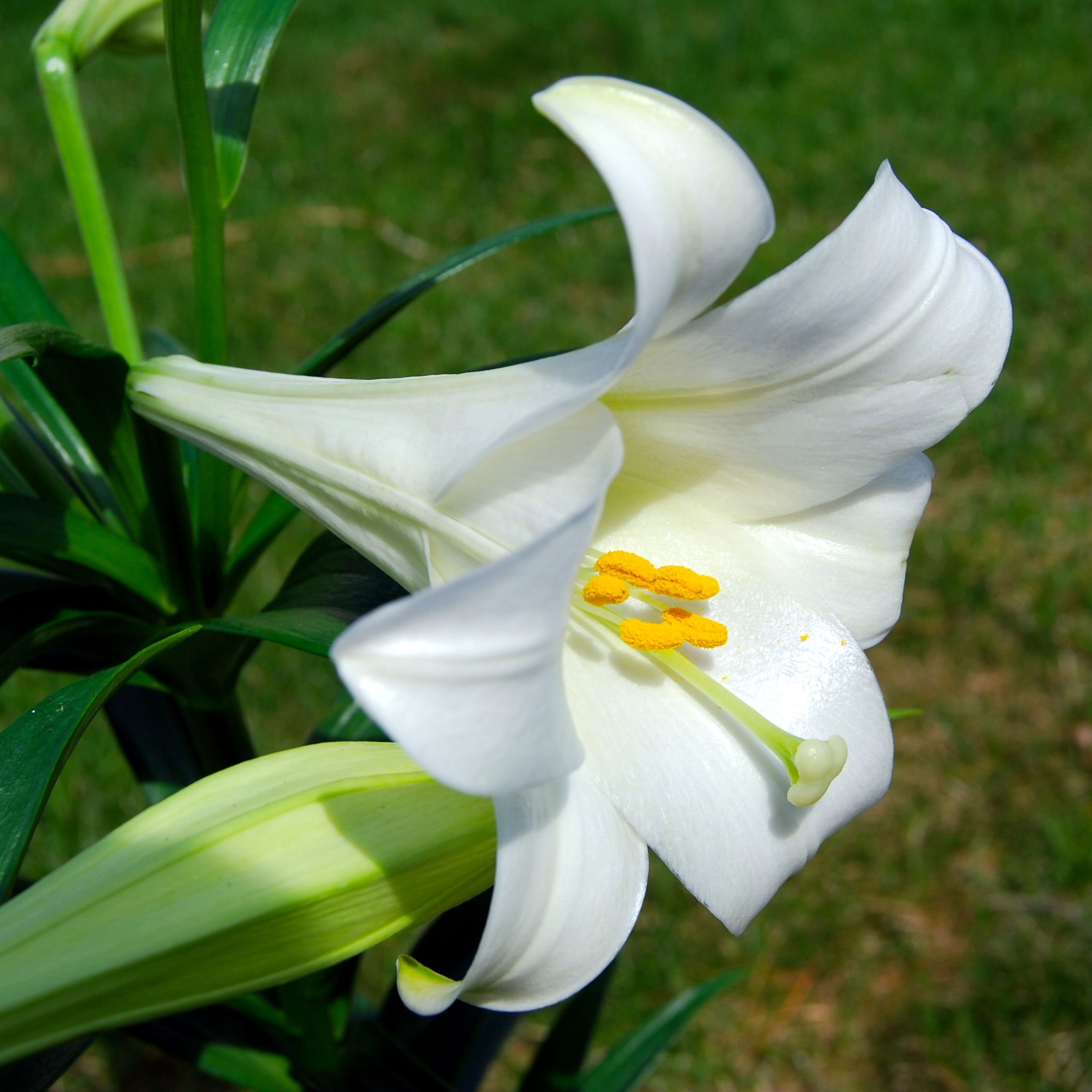
A white lily, the de facto symbol of the yuri genre.

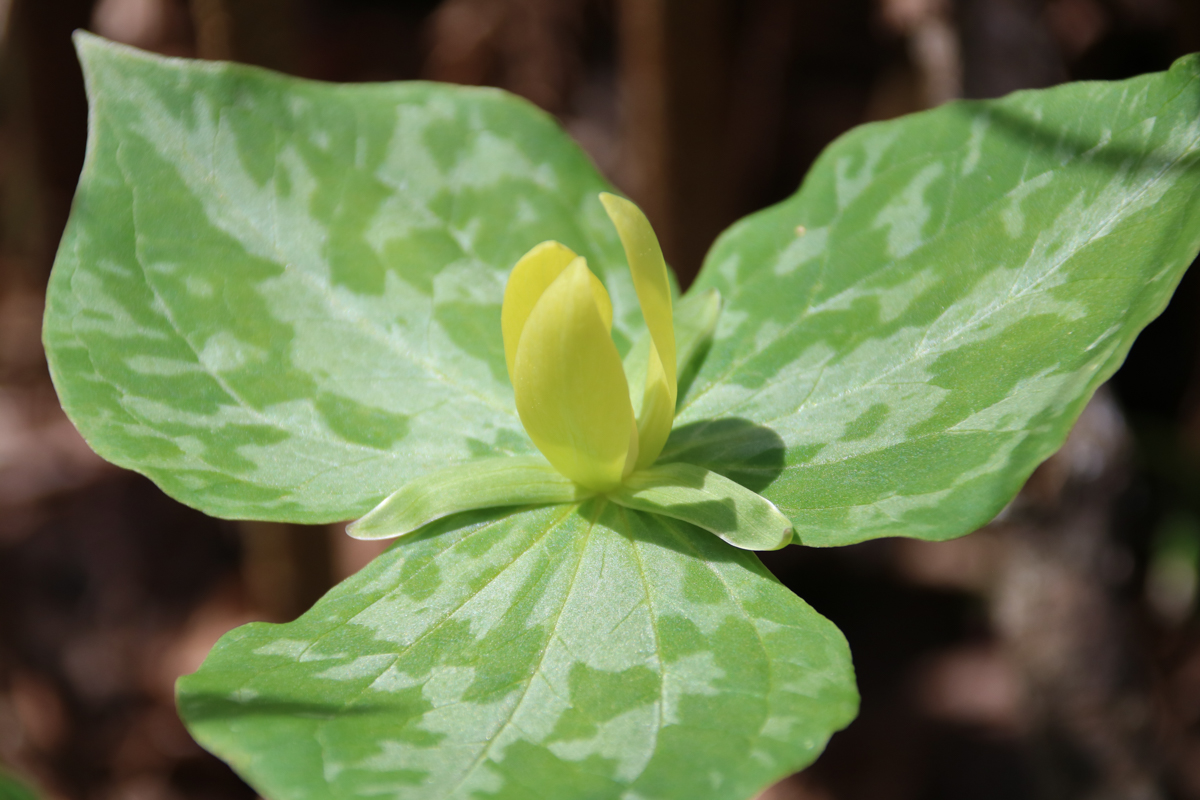
The trillium flower is a symbol of bisexuality.

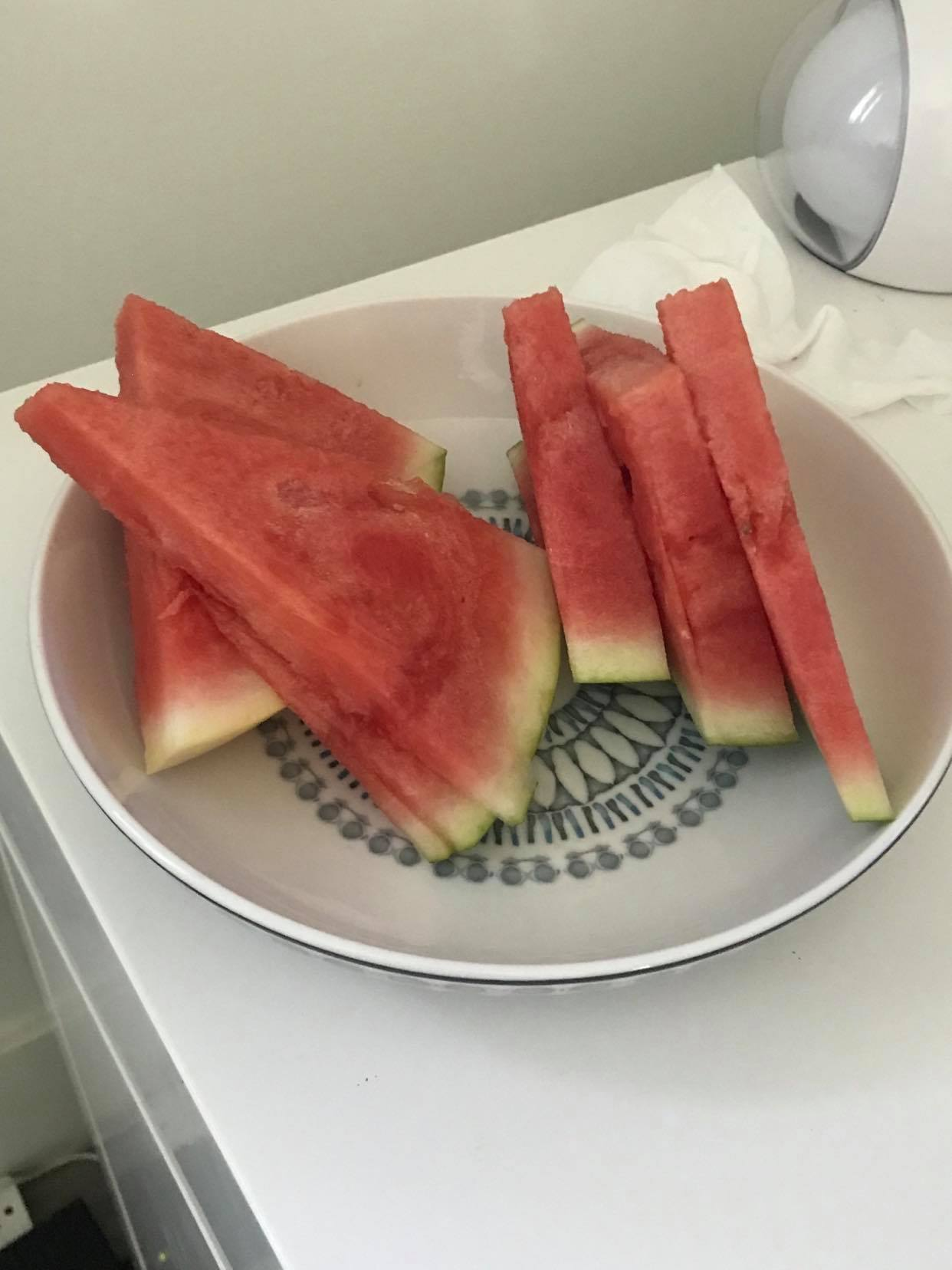
Slices of watermelon. Because it is composed primarily of water, the watermelon symbolizes a sexuality that is fluid.

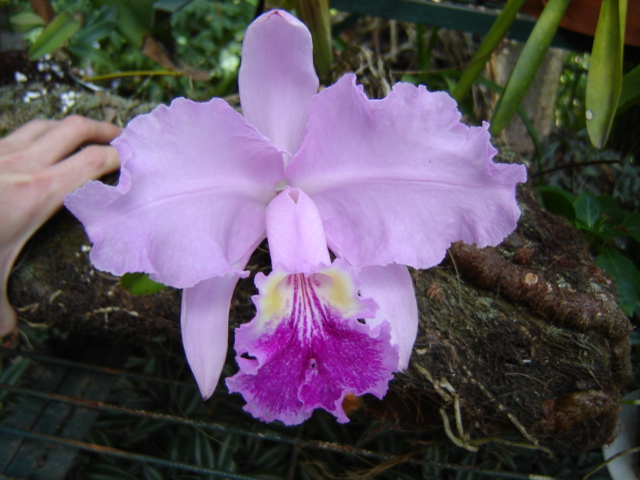
An orchid flower. Because the word "orchid" comes from the Greek word for testicle, and the orchiectomy is a common surgery performed on intersex infants –especially those with androgen insensitivity syndrome– the orchid flower is a symbol of being intersex and of opposition to non-consensual genital surgery.

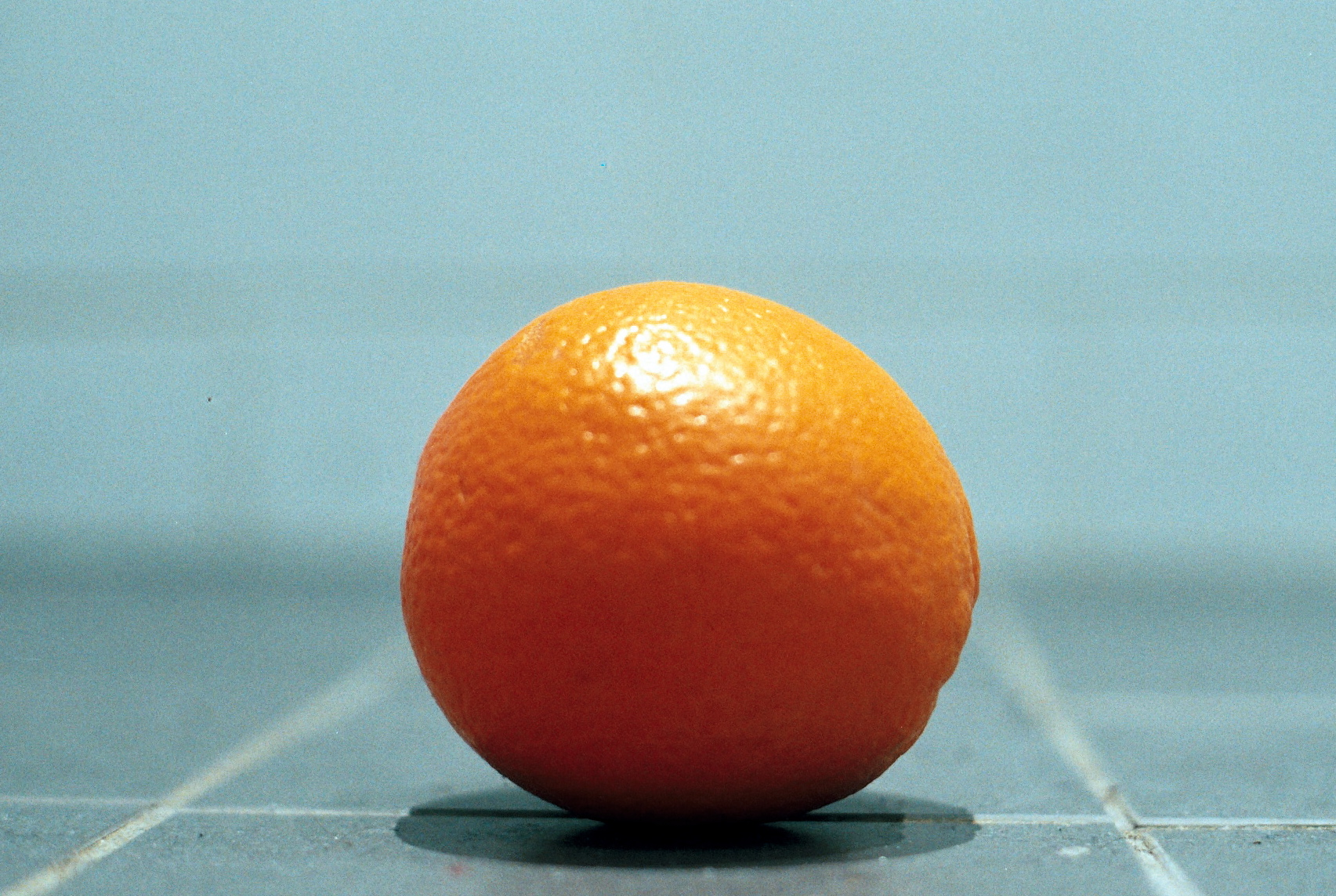
An orange. In 2022, fruit became popular with trans and nonbinary people.

== Animals ==
Animals that lovers gave as gifts to their beloved also became symbols of pederastic love, such as hares, roosters, deer, felines and oxen, as a metaphor for sexual pursuits.

=== Blåhaj ===
Small and large variants of Blåhaj, displayed from the bottom (above) and side (below)

The IKEA plush toy shark Blåhaj (stylized BLÅHAJ, Swedish pronunciation: [ˈblôːhaj], lit. 'blue shark'; colloquially anglicised as /ˈblɑːhɑːʒ/, /ˈblɑːhɑː/ or /ˈbloʊhaɪ/) is commonly associated with LGBTQ culture, in particular the transgender community, in part due to being colored similarly to a transgender pride flag. Early origins of this are traced back to around 2020 and in 2021, when IKEA ran an ad-campaign to support same-sex marriage in Switzerland featuring the shark alongside other plush toys.

In response to this popularity, IKEA Canada hosted a giveaway in November 2022, offering transgender people a special edition Blåhaj in the colors of a transgender pride flag, with the winner's name embroidered on its fin.

=== Lavender rhinoceros ===
A lavender rhinoceros, a symbol used as a sign of gay visibility.

Daniel Thaxton and Bernie Toale created a lavender rhinoceros symbol for a public ad campaign to increase visibility for gay people in Boston helmed by Gay Media Action-Advertising; Toale said they chose a rhinoceros because "it is a much maligned and misunderstood animal" and that it was lavender because that is a mix of pink and blue, making it a symbolic merger of the feminine and masculine. (Lavender had already been used to represent LGBTQ people in other contexts). However, in May 1974, Metro Transit Advertising said its lawyers could not "determine eligibility of the public service rate" for the lavender rhinoceros ads, which tripled the cost of the ad campaign. Gay Media Action challenged this but were unsuccessful. The lavender rhinoceros symbol was seen on signs, pins, and t-shirts at the Boston Pride Parade later in 1974, and a life-sized papier-mâché lavender rhinoceros was part of the parade. Money was raised for the ads, and they began running on the Massachusetts Bay Transportation Authority's Green Line by December 3, 1974, and ran there until February 1975. The lavender rhinoceros continued as a symbol of the gay community, appearing at the 1976 Boston Pride Parade and on a flag that was raised at Boston City Hall in 1987.

Outside of Boston, Theatre Rhinoceros, located in San Francisco, and founded in 1977, based its name on this symbol. Theatre Rhinoceros, also called Theatre Rhino, or The Rhino, is a gay and lesbian theatre. It claims to be the world's longest-running professional queer theatre company. An online bookstore focused on LGBTQ authors and books called "The Lavender Rhino" launched in 2023.

=== Unicorn ===
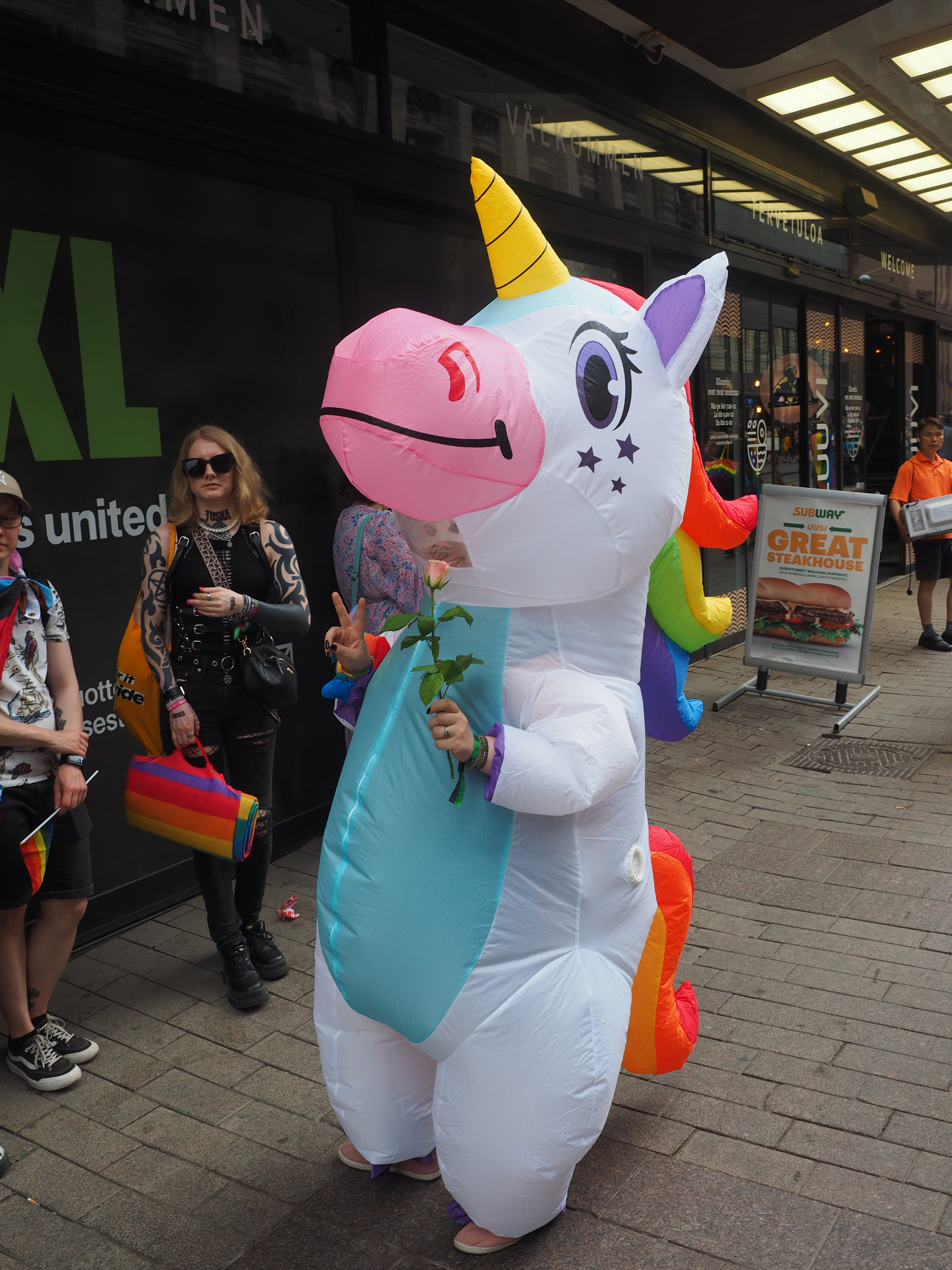
A person dressed up as a unicorn at Helsinki Pride 2023.

Unicorns have become a symbol of LGBTQ culture due to earlier associations between the animal and rainbows being extended to the rainbow flag created in 1978 by Gilbert Baker. Scholars have also traced a connection between Peter S. Beagle's 1968 novel The Last Unicorn and the unicorn's evolution as an LGBTQ symbol, pointing to a number of queer and transgender responses to it, including a gay bar named The Last Unicorn in the 1980s.

Alice Fisher of The Guardian wrote in 2017, "The unicorn has also done its bit for the LGBT community in the last century... Rainbows and unicorns are so intrinsically linked (the association is also a Victorian invention) that it's unsurprising that the magic creature started to appear on T-shirts and banners at Gay Pride around the world, with slogans such as 'Gender is Imaginary' or 'Totally Straight' emblazoned under sparkling rainbow unicorns."

Gay Star News said in 2018 that unicorns are the "gay, LGBTI and queer icons of our time".

=== Butterfly ===
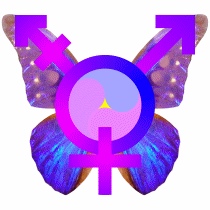
A transgender butterfly symbol.

Due to the metamorphosis from caterpillar to butterfly, butterflies are often used as symbols of transformation. Because of this, they can symbolize gender transition and transgender identity.

== Other symbols ==
Symbols of the LGBTQ community have been used to represent members' unity, pride, shared values, and allegiance to one another.

=== Triangle badges of Nazi Germany ===
One of the oldest of these symbols is the downward-pointing pink triangle that male homosexuals, male bisexuals, and transgender women in Nazi concentration camps were required to wear on their clothing. The badge is one of several badges that internees wore to identify what kind of prisoners they were. Many of the estimated 5,000–15,000 gay men imprisoned in concentration camps did not survive. The pink triangle was later reclaimed by gay men, as well as some lesbians, in various political movements as a symbol of personal pride and remembrance. AIDS Coalition to Unleash Power (ACT-UP) adopted the downward-pointing pink triangle to symbolize the "active fight back" against HIV/AIDS "rather than a passive resignation to fate."

The pink triangle was used exclusively with male prisoners, including transfeminine individuals, as cisgender lesbians were not included under Paragraph 175, a statute which made homosexual acts between males a crime. Lesbian sexual relations were illegal only in Austria and historians differ on whether they were persecuted or not, due to lack of evidence. Some lesbians were imprisoned with a black triangle symbolizing supposed "asociality", this symbol was later reclaimed by postwar lesbians.

The downward-pointing pink triangle was used to identify homosexual men and transgender women in the concentration camps.

The downward-pointing black triangle was used to mark individuals considered "asocial". The category included homosexual women, nonconformists, sex workers, nomads, Romani, and others.

The downward-pointing pink triangle overlapping a yellow triangle was used to single out male homosexual prisoners who were Jewish.

==== Biangles ====
The biangles, designed by artist Liz Nania to represent bisexuality

The biangles were designed by artist Liz Nania, as she co-organized a bisexual contingent for the Second National March on Washington for Lesbian and Gay Rights in 1987. The design of the biangles began with the pink triangle, a Nazi concentration camp badge that later became a symbol of gay liberation representing homosexuality. The addition of a blue triangle contrasts the pink and represents heterosexuality. The two triangles overlap and form lavender, which represents the "queerness of bisexuality", referencing the Lavender Menace and 1980s and 1990s associations of lavender with queerness.

Michael Page stated that, when designing the bisexual flag, he took the colors and overlap of the flag from the biangles.

=== Double crescent moon ===
The double crescent moon bisexuality symbol with bisexual flag colors, designed by Vivian Wagner

Another version of the double crescent moon bisexuality symbol with bisexual flag colors

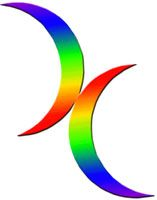
A version of the double crescent moon bisexuality symbol with rainbow flag colors

Some bisexual individuals object to the use of a pink triangle in the biangles symbol of bisexuality (see above), as it was a symbol that Adolf Hitler's regime used to tag and persecute homosexuals. In response, a double crescent moon symbol of bisexuality was devised by Vivian Wagner in 1998. The colors are variously those of the bisexual or rainbow flag. This symbol is common in Germany and surrounding countries.

=== Asexual and aromantic symbols ===
The ace ring, a black ring worn on the middle finger of one's right hand, is a way asexual people signify their asexuality. The ring is deliberately worn in a similar manner as one would a wedding ring to symbolize marriage. Use of the symbol began in 2005.

The aro ring, a white ring, worn on the middle finger on one's left hand is a way aromantic people signify their identity on the aromantic spectrum. Use of the symbol began in 2015. This was chosen as the opposite of the ace ring which is a black ring worn on the right hand.

Another symbol often used by aromantic people is arrows or an arrow as the word arrow is a homophone to the shortened word, "aro" used by aromantic people to refer to themselves.

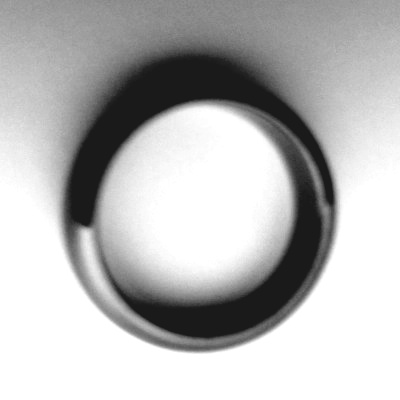
Ace ring, meant to be worn on the right middle finger.

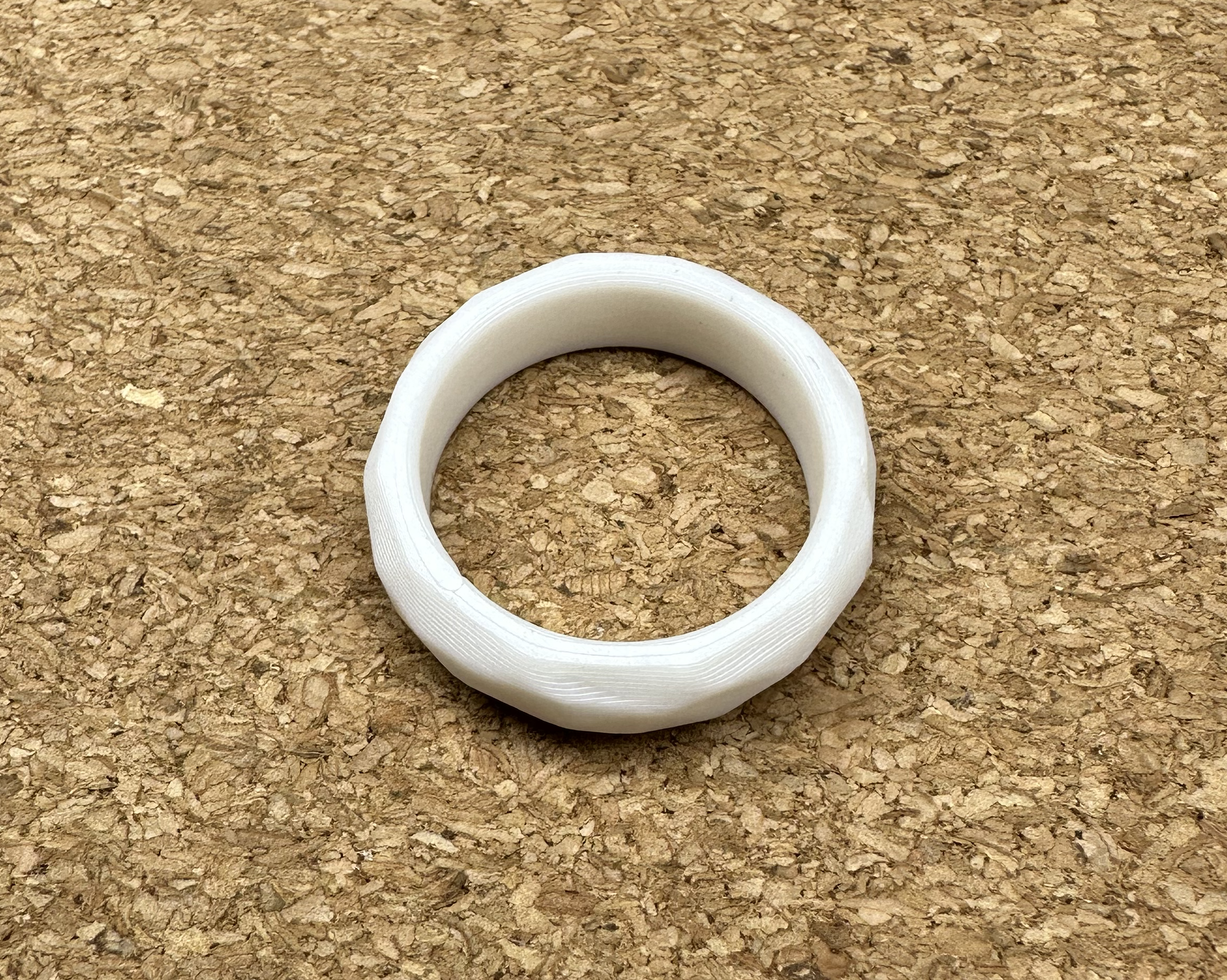
Aro ring, meant to be worn on the left middle finger

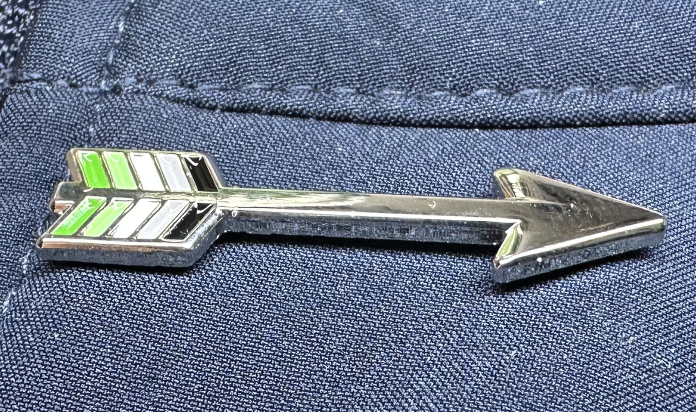
A pin depicting an arrow with the fletching representing the Aromantic Pride flag colors

==== Ace playing cards representing asexuality ====
Ace playing cards, due to the phonetic shortening from asexual to ace, are sometimes used to represent asexuality. The ace of hearts and ace of spades are used to symbolize romantic asexuality and aromantic asexuality respectively. Also, the ace of clubs is used to symbolize gray asexuality and grayromanticism, and the ace of diamonds is used to symbolize demiromanticism and demisexuality.

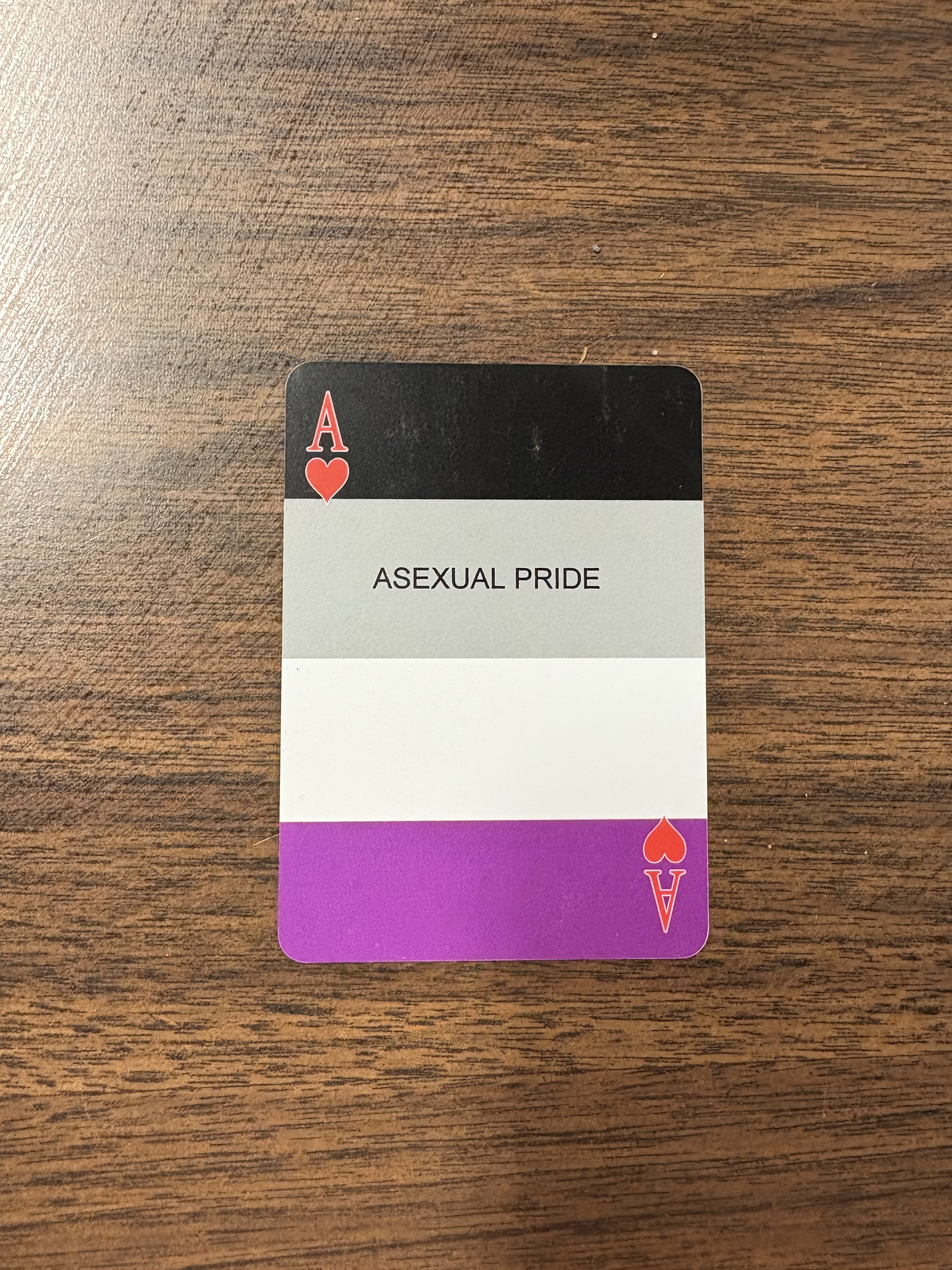
An ace of hearts with the words “ASEXUAL PRIDE” on it and asexual flag colors in the background, part of a display for International Asexuality Day set up in Pennsylvania in 2025.

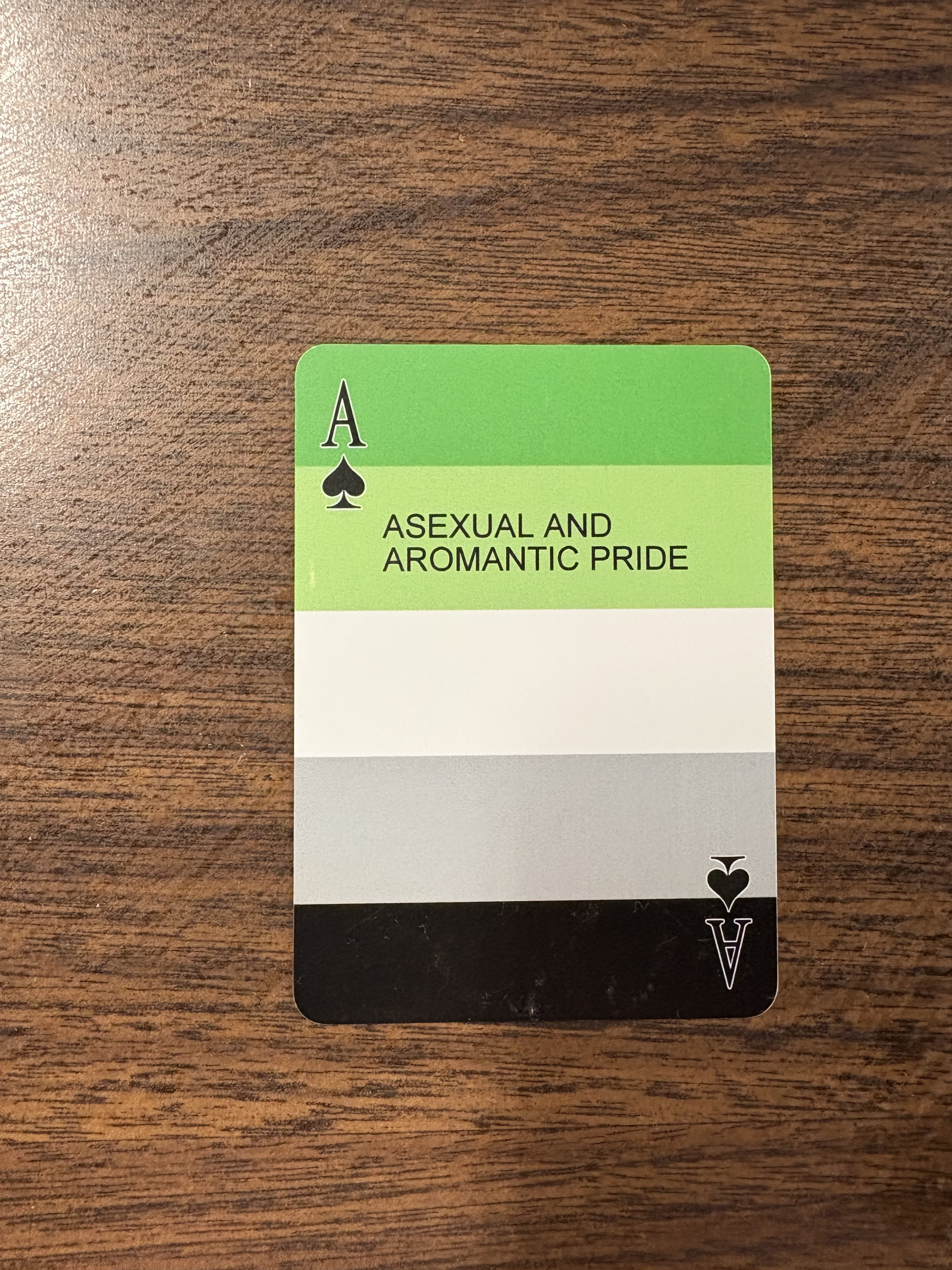
An ace of spades with the words “ASEXUAL AND AROMANTIC PRIDE” on it and aromantic flag colors in the background, part of a display for International Asexuality Day set up in Pennsylvania in 2025.

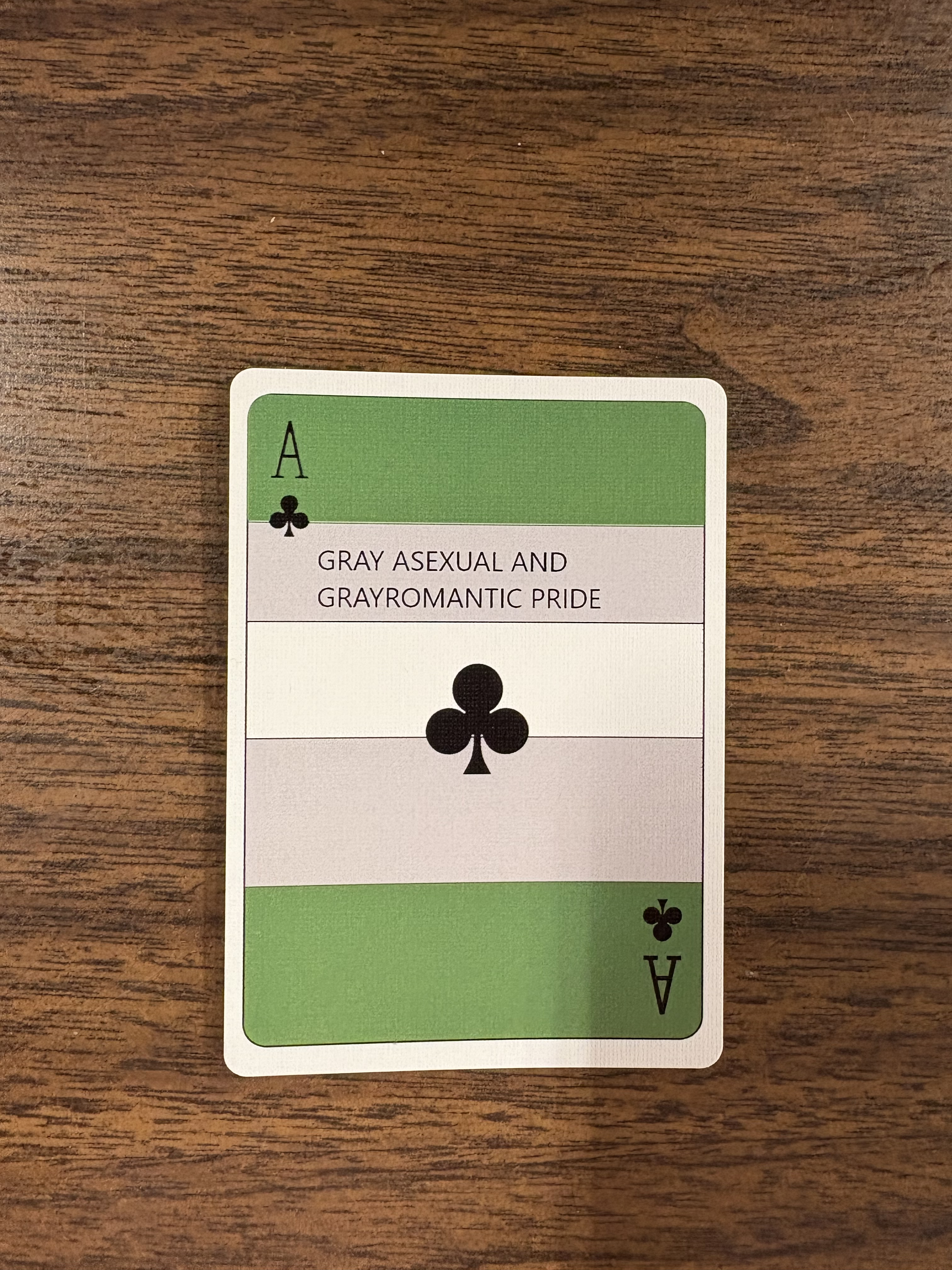
An ace of clubs with the words “GRAY ASEXUAL AND GRAYROMANTIC PRIDE” on it and grayromantic flag colors in the background, part of a display for International Asexuality Day set up in Pennsylvania in 2025.

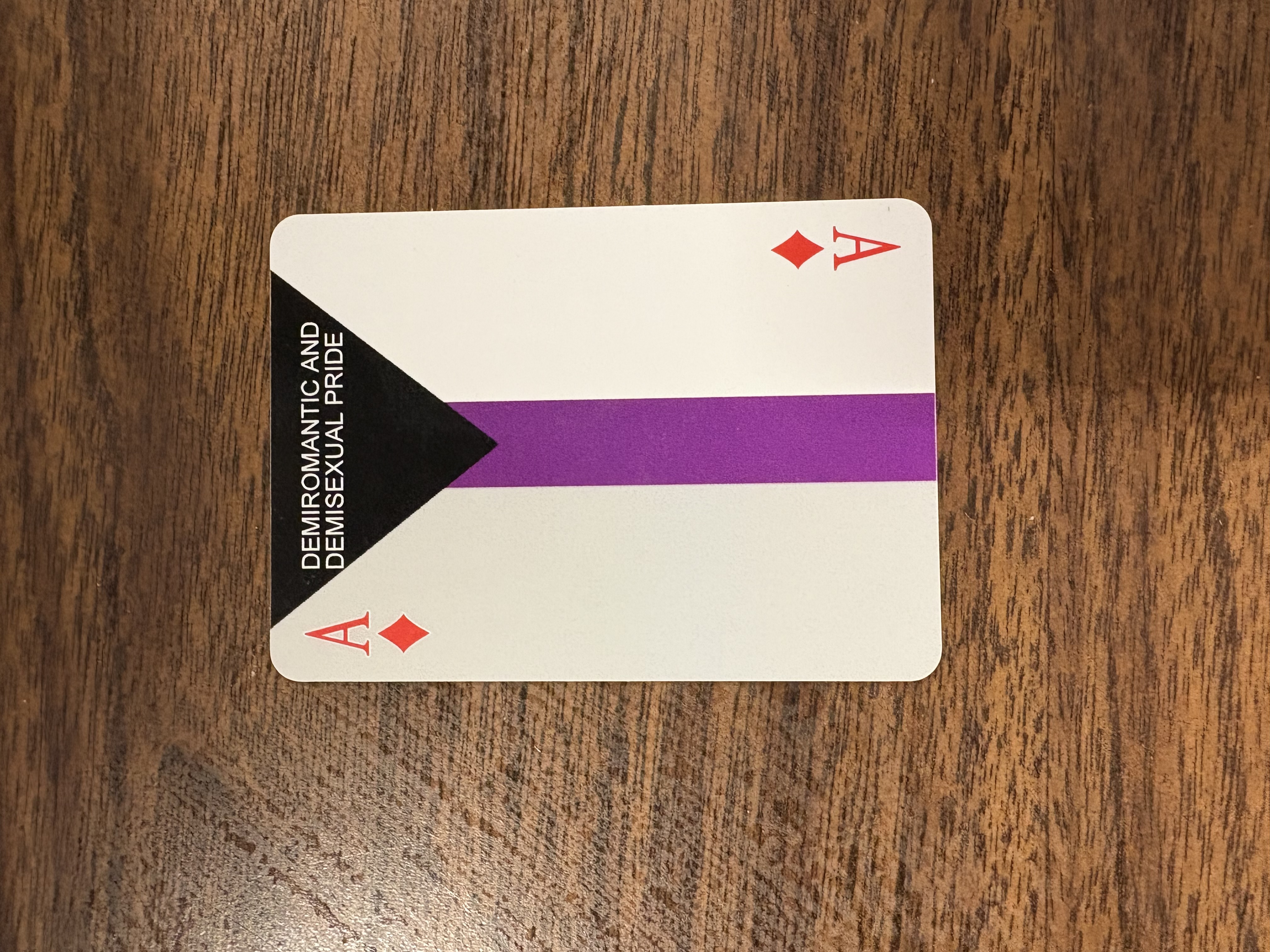
An ace of diamonds with the words “DEMIROMANTIC AND DEMISEXUAL PRIDE” on it and demisexual flag colors in the background, part of a display for International Asexuality Day set up in Pennsylvania in 2025.

=== Freedom Rings ===
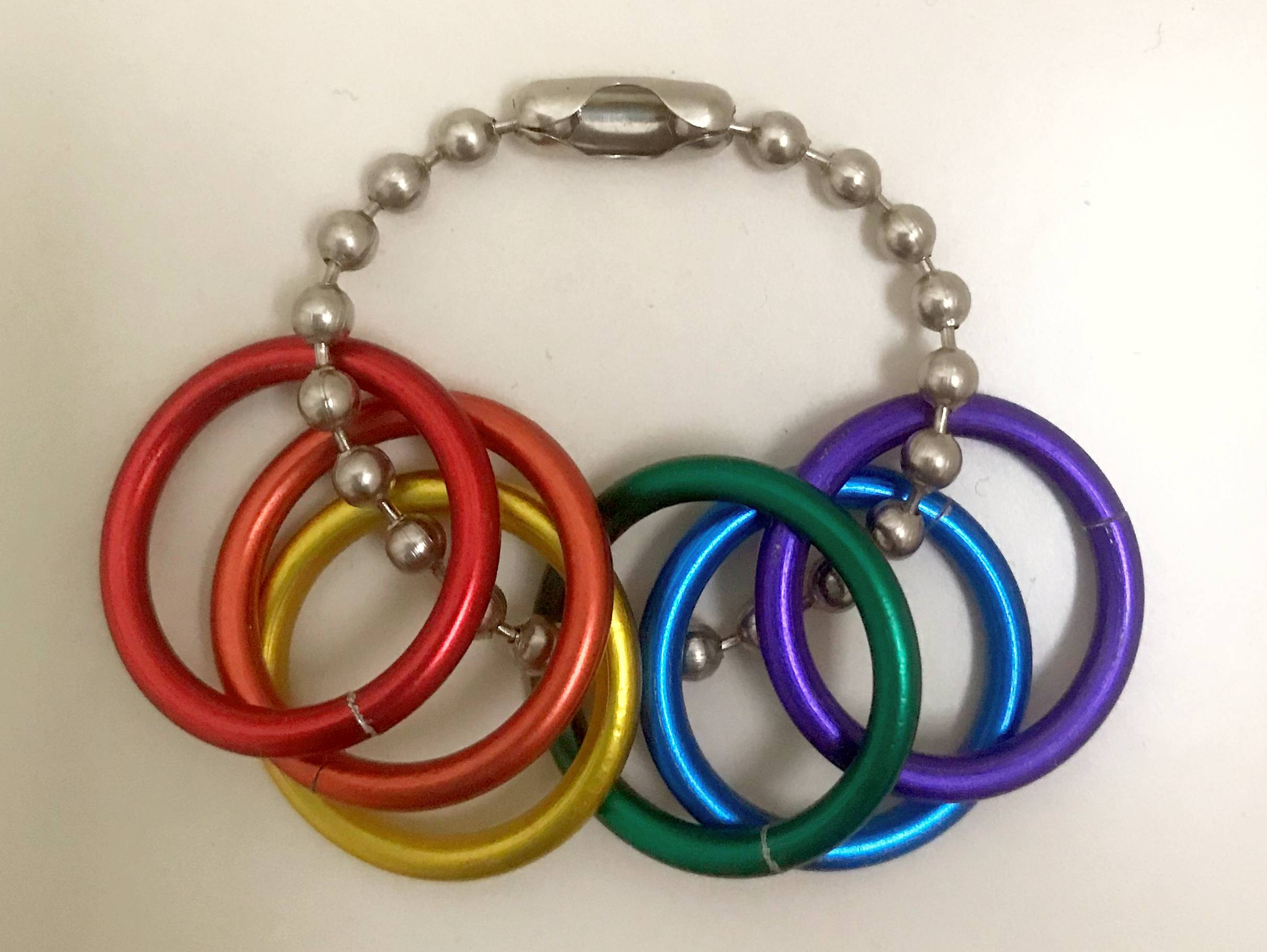
Freedom Rings on a keychain

Freedom Rings, designed by David Spada in 1991, are six aluminum rings, each in one of the colors of the rainbow flag. These rings are worn by themselves or as part of necklaces, bracelets, and keychains. They are a symbol of gay pride, and were originally sold as a fundraiser for the 1991 San Francisco Gay Freedom Day Parade and quickly became a national trend. In June 1992, several of MTV's on-air hosts wore Freedom Rings in recognition of Pride Month, elevating their visibility. They are sometimes referred to as "Fruit Loops".

=== Gaysper ===
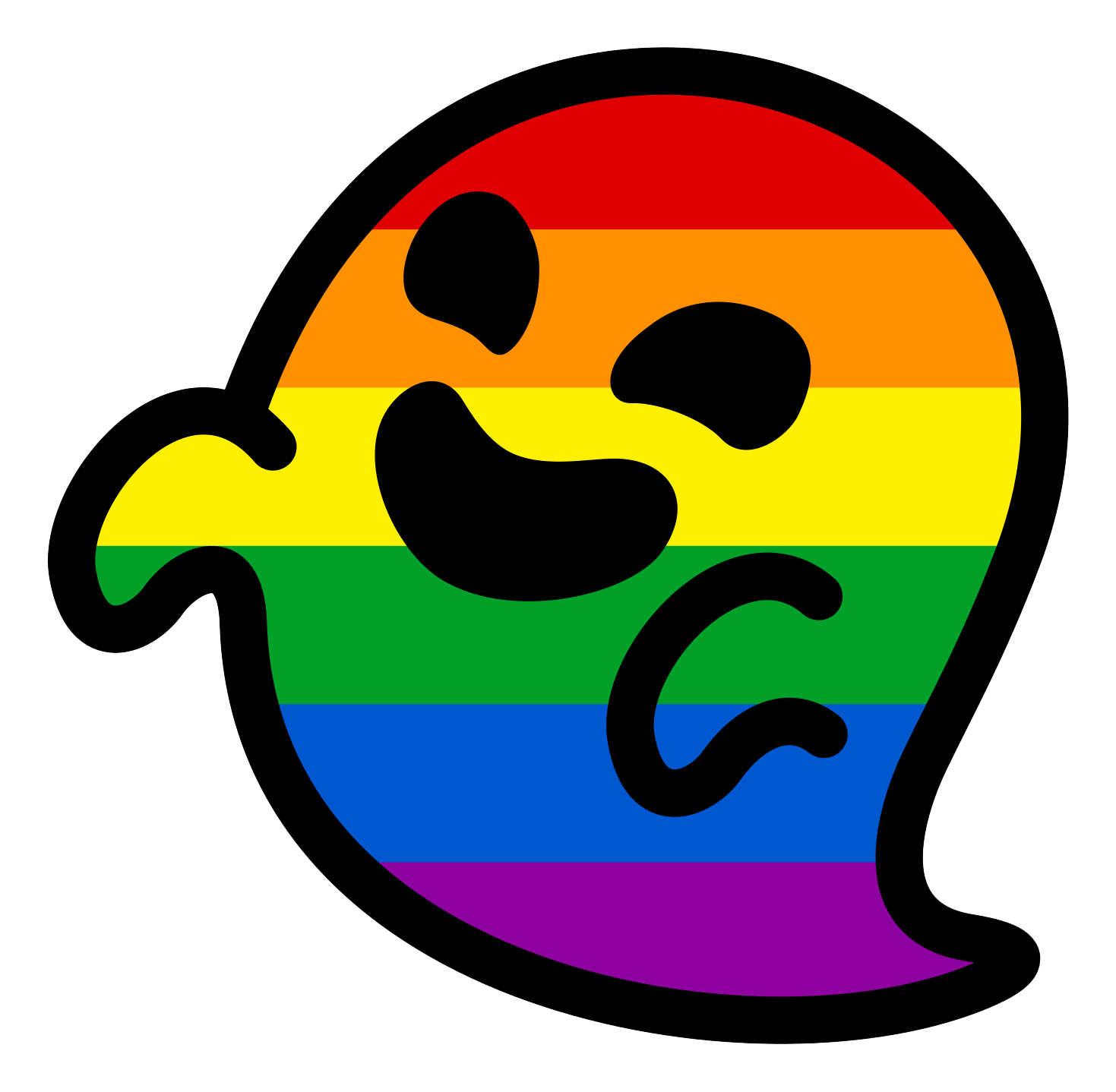
Gaysper

Gaysper is an LGBTQ symbol based on the ghost emoji (U+1F47B, "👻") of Android 5.0. It is a modification of the original icon that uses a background with the colors of the rainbow flag. It became popular in Spain from April 2019 following a tweet posted on the official account of the populist far-right party Vox, after which a multitude of users belonging to the LGBTQ movement began to use it as a symbol. The icon has established itself as an example of the phenomenon of reappropriation of elements of the anti-LGBTQ discourse in contemporary society through social networks. Other versions derived from the original symbol involving other flags belonging to the LGBTQ community, such as the transgender flag, or the bisexual flag, have also become popular.

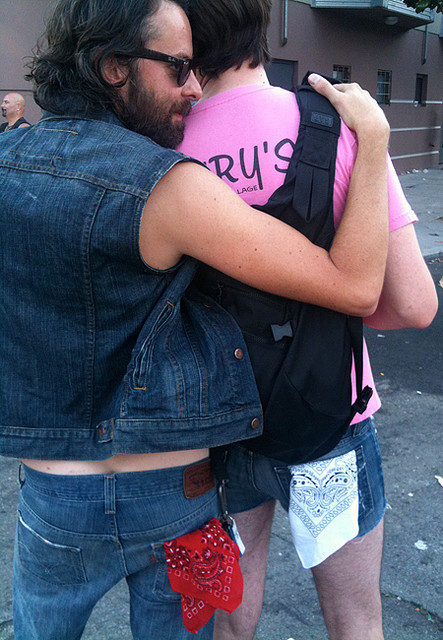
Two men using the hanky code

=== Handkerchief code ===
In the 1970s, the modern handkerchief (or hanky) code emerged in the form of bandanas, worn in back pockets, in colors that signaled sexual interests, fetishes, and if the wearer was a "top" or "bottom". It was popular among the gay leather community of the United States and the cruising scene more broadly.

=== Carabiner code ===
In the wake of World War II, many working class woman-loving women, especially butches, began wearing carabiners as a symbol of their gender nonconformity and as a method of non-verbal communication of sexual role preference between women.

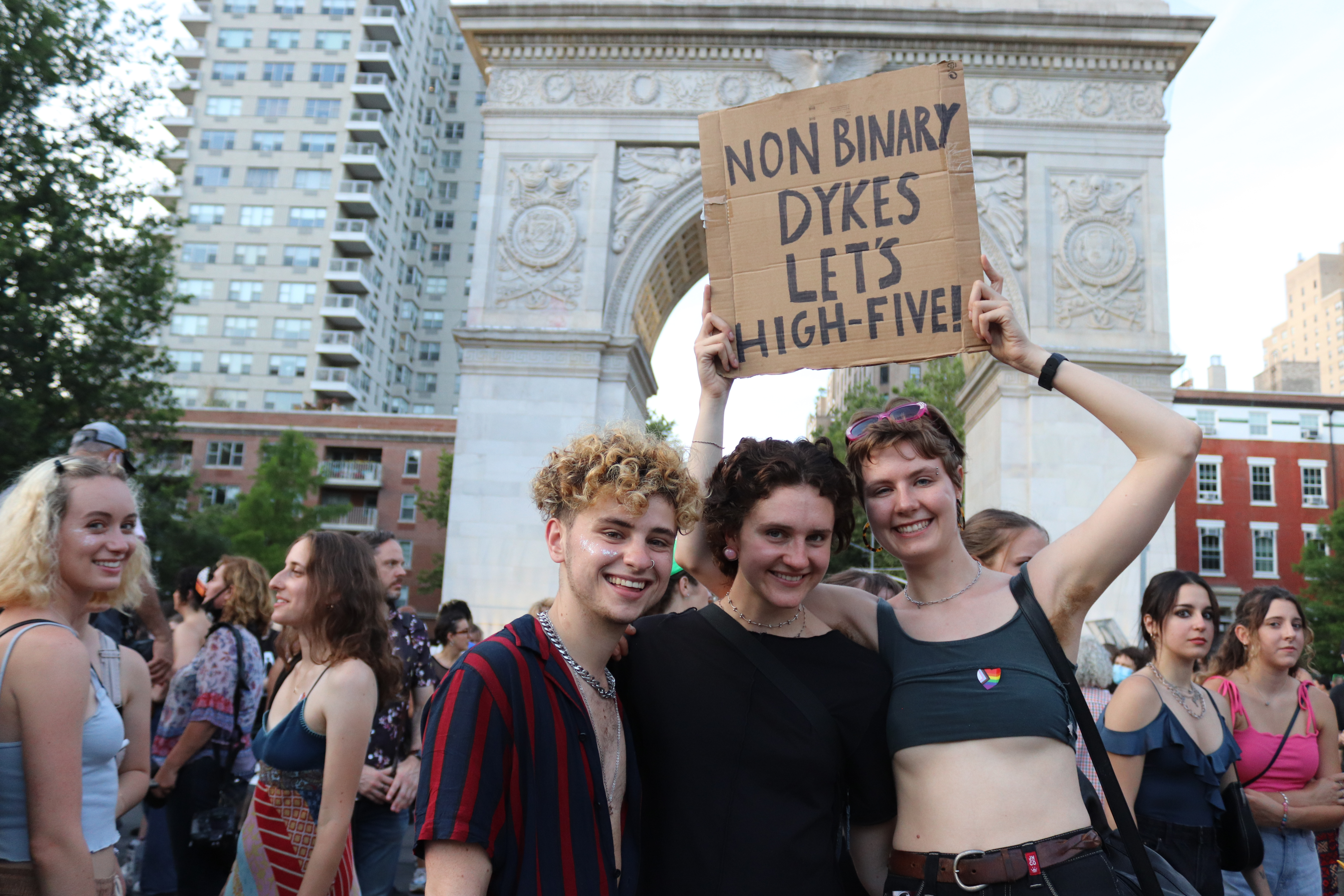
2021 New York City Dyke March arrival

=== High five ===
There are many origin stories of the high five, but the two most documented candidates are Dusty Baker and Glenn Burke of the Los Angeles Dodgers professional baseball team on October 2, 1977, and Wiley Brown and Derek Smith of the Louisville Cardinals men's basketball team during the 1978–1979 season. After retiring from baseball, Burke, who was one of the first openly gay professional athletes, used the high five with other gay residents of the Castro district of San Francisco, and it became a symbol of gay pride.

=== Lesbian manicure ===
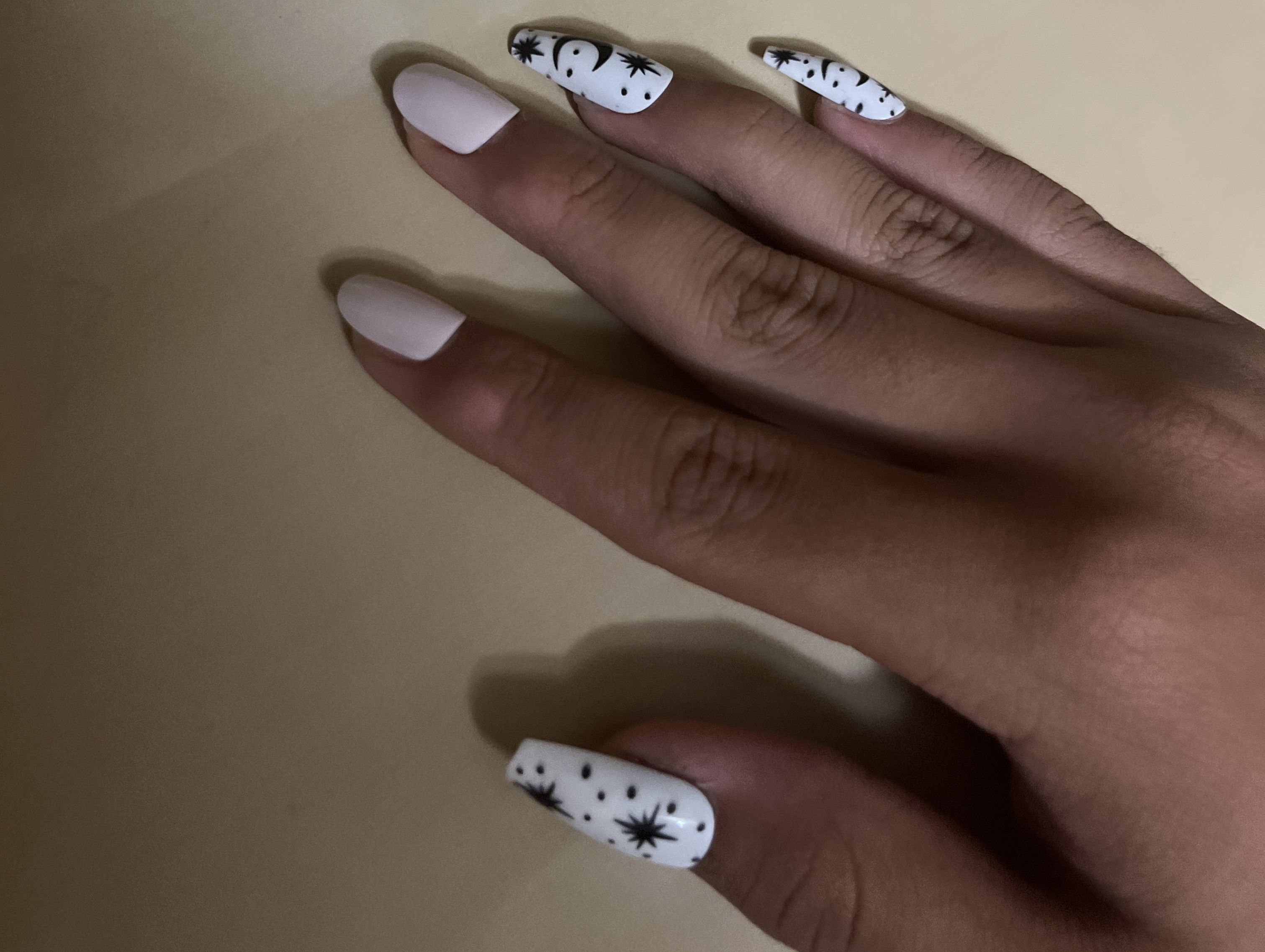
An example of a lesbian manicure (right-handed)

A lesbian manicure (also known as queer manicure, lez nails, or femmicure) (Note: From the LGBTQ slang terms queer, lez, and femme respectively.) is a style or trend of manicure intended to allow lesbians and other queer people in the LGBTQ community to safely and easily perform digital penetration during sex. The most distinct and modern form of the manicure entails long nail extensions on every finger apart from the index finger, middle finger, and sometimes thumb of the dominant hand, thus preventing injury or discomfort to the vulva or vagina during intercourse while otherwise maintaining the fashion of long acrylic nails in one's daily life. The style is often seen as a public expression or symbol of lesbian identity, particularly on the femme side of the femme-butch spectrum.

=== Purple hand ===
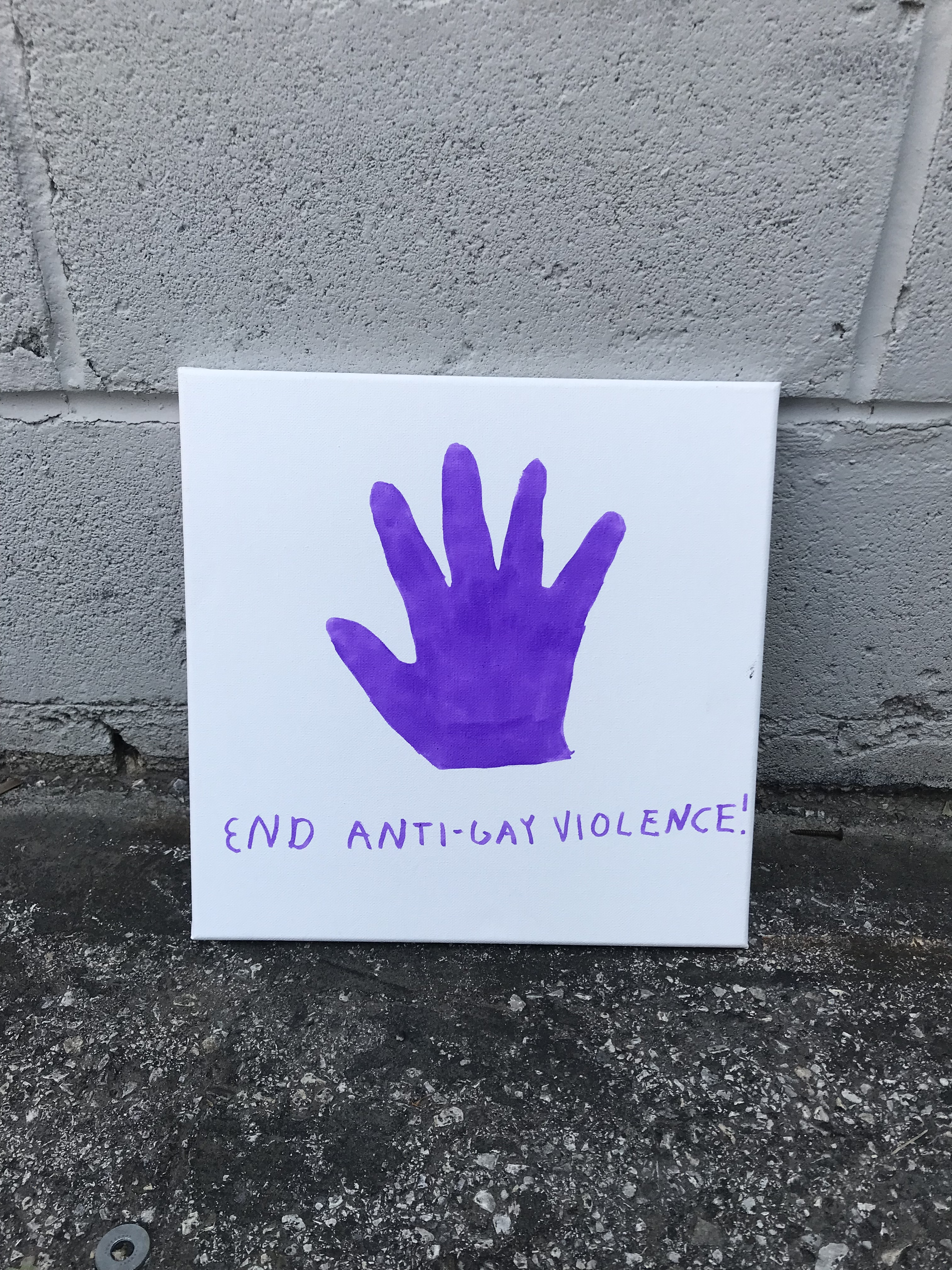
A purple hand symbol created and displayed in 2024 in Pennsylvania

On October 31, 1969, sixty members of the Gay Liberation Front, the Committee for Homosexual Freedom (CHF), and the Gay Guerilla Theatre group staged a protest outside the offices of the San Francisco Examiner in response to a series of news articles disparaging people in San Francisco's gay bars and clubs. The peaceful protest against the Examiner turned tumultuous and was later called "Friday of the Purple Hand" and "Bloody Friday of the Purple Hand". Examiner employees "dumped a barrel of printers' ink on the crowd from the roof of the newspaper building", according to glbtq.com. Some reports state that it was a barrel of ink poured from the roof of the building. The protestors "used the ink to scrawl slogans on the building walls" and slap purple hand prints "throughout downtown [San Francisco]" resulting in "one of the most visible demonstrations of gay power" according to the Bay Area Reporter. According to Larry LittleJohn, then president of Society for Individual Rights, "At that point, the tactical squad arrived — not to get the employees who dumped the ink, but to arrest the demonstrators. Somebody could have been hurt if that ink had gotten into their eyes, but the police were knocking people to the ground." The accounts of police brutality include women being thrown to the ground and protesters' teeth being knocked out. Inspired by Black Hand extortion methods of Camorra gangsters and the Mafia, some gay and lesbian activists attempted to institute "purple hand" as a symbol against anti-gay attacks, but the symbol was only briefly used. In Turkey, the LGBTQ rights organization MorEl Eskişehir LGBTT Oluşumu (Purple Hand Eskişehir LGBT Formation) bears the name of this symbol.

=== Star tattoo ===
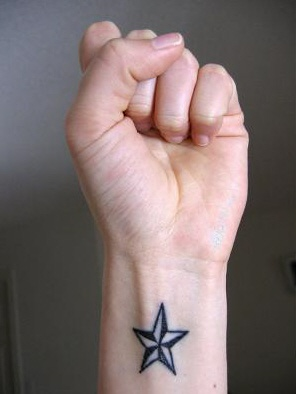
A blue five-pointed nautical star wrist tattoo

In the 1950s, some lesbians in Buffalo, New York wore a blue five-pointed star tattoo on the wrist, a location that could be covered by a watch. People getting tattoos to reflect this history may choose a nautical-style star.

=== White knot ===
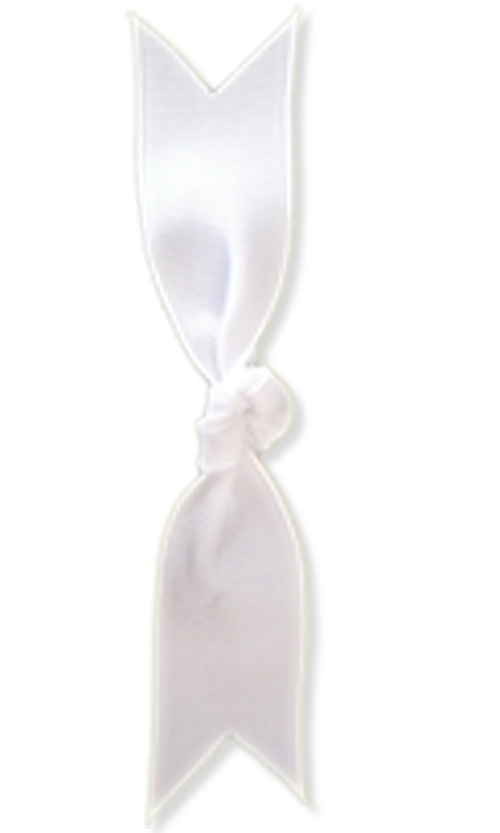
A white knot

The white knot is a symbol of support for same-sex marriage in the United States. The white knot combines two symbols of marriage, the color white and "tying the knot," to represent support for same-sex marriage. The white knot has been worn publicly by many celebrities as a means of demonstrating solidarity with that cause.

The white knot was created by Frank Voci in November 2008, in response to the passage of Proposition 8 in California and bans on same-sex marriage and denial of other civil rights for LGBTQ persons across the nation.

== Flags ==
Created in 1978, the rainbow flag is the most commonly used pride flag.

A pride flag is any flag that represents a segment or part of the LGBTQ community. Pride in this case refers to the notion of LGBTQ pride. The terms LGBTQ flag and queer flag are also often used interchangeably.

== Gallery ==
=== Symbols ===
Biangles
(represents bisexuality)

Double moon
(represents bisexuality)

Double female symbol
(represents lesbian women)

Double male symbol
(represents gay men)

Interlocking gender symbols

Interlocking gender symbols

Four interlocking gender symbols

Labrys
(represents lesbian feminism)

Lambda
(represents gay liberation)

Pansexual symbol

Androgyne + male + female symbol, the most common transgender symbol

Pink and blue transgender

Transfeminist symbol

Triskelion (BDSM symbol) with bisexual flag colors

Pink and blue chameleon (genderfluid)

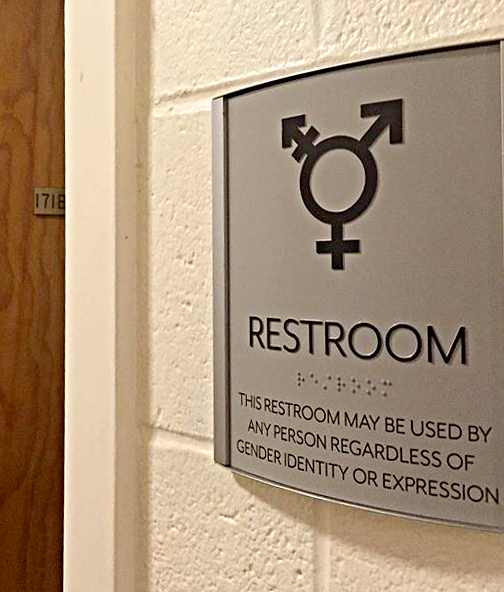
Androgyne + male + female symbol identifying unisex / inclusive restroom

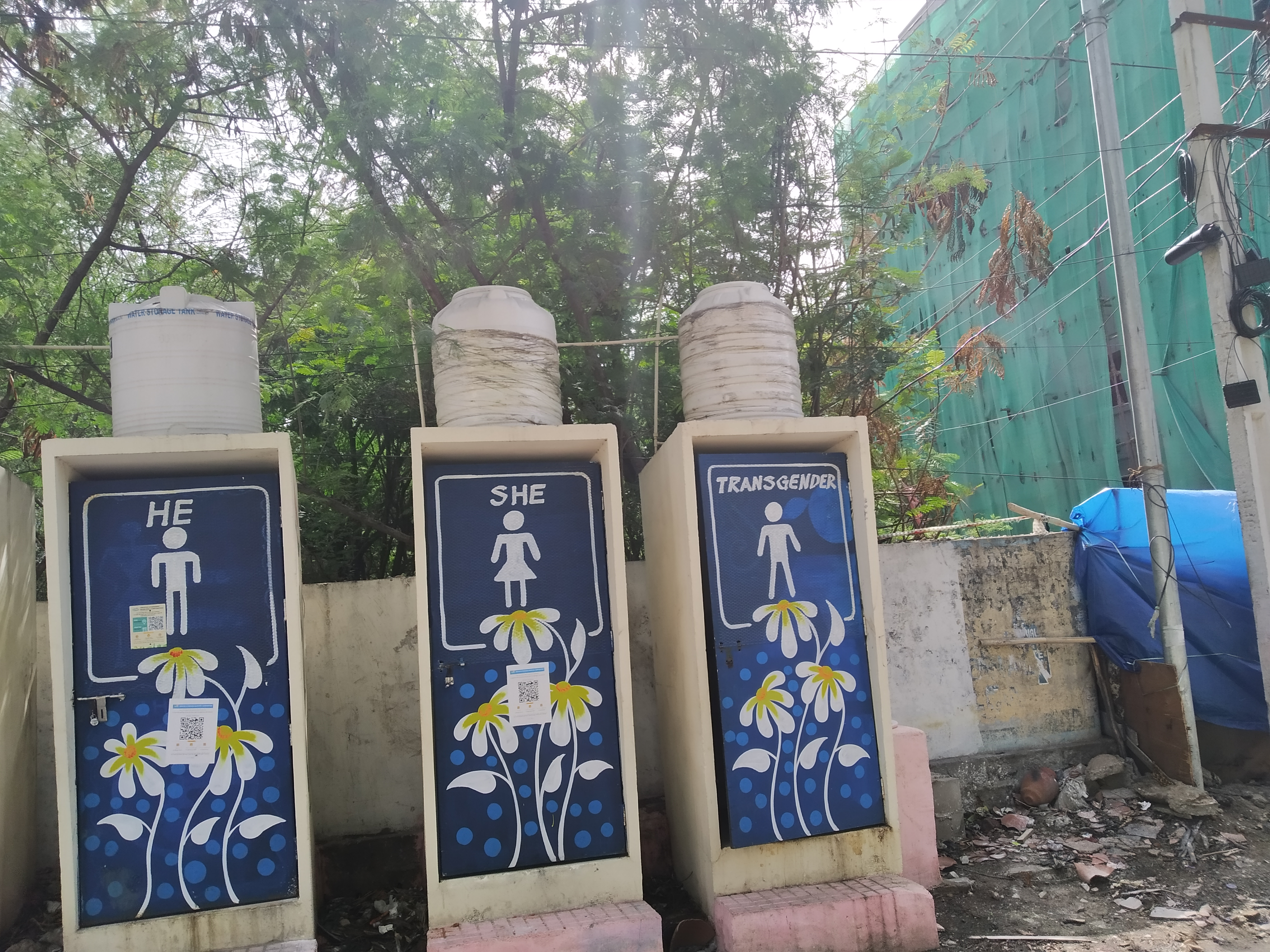
Male, female and hijra public toilets in India

=== Simple icons ===
Asexuality; Agender, non-binary
(a larger circle in genealogies means 'female')

Androgyne (no particular appearance), gender-queer, gender-neutral

sometimes distinguished:
androgyne (female appearance)

sometimes distinguished:
androgyne (male appearance)

Asexual

Bigender (also androgyne, agender, etc.); in botany: bisexual / hermaphroditic

Bisexual

Bisexual (female)

Bisexual (male)

Bisexual (Whitehead link); Unisex

Demi-boy

Demi-girl

double crescent

Gay (male) union

Intersex; Gender-fluid (symbol of fluid quicksilver); non-binary

Androgyne male

Heterosexual union

Intergender

Lesbian union

Neuter (asexual, neutral, neutrois); botany: asexual reproduction; zoology: non-reproducing (e.g. worker bees)

Non-binary

Non-binary (glyph variant)

Non-binary (comet, contrasting with Venus for female and Mars for male)

Other/undefined gender (transgender, non-binary, gender-fluid)

Pansexual

Rotating / fluctuating gender expression

Transgender, transsexual, gender-queer; gender inclusive (male, female and androgyne / transgender)

=== Sexual orientation–based flags ===
Aceflux

Achillean

Abrosexual

Asexual

Bisexual

Demisexual

Gay men

Gay men (five stripes)

Gray asexual/graysexual

Labrys lesbian/
lesbian feminist

Lipstick lesbian
(Illustration of original)

Lesbian (up to 2018)

Lesbian
(since 2018; seven stripes)

Lesbian
(since 2018; five stripes)

Omnisexual

Pansexual

Polysexual

Sapphic

=== Romantic attraction–based flags ===
Aromantic

Demiromantic

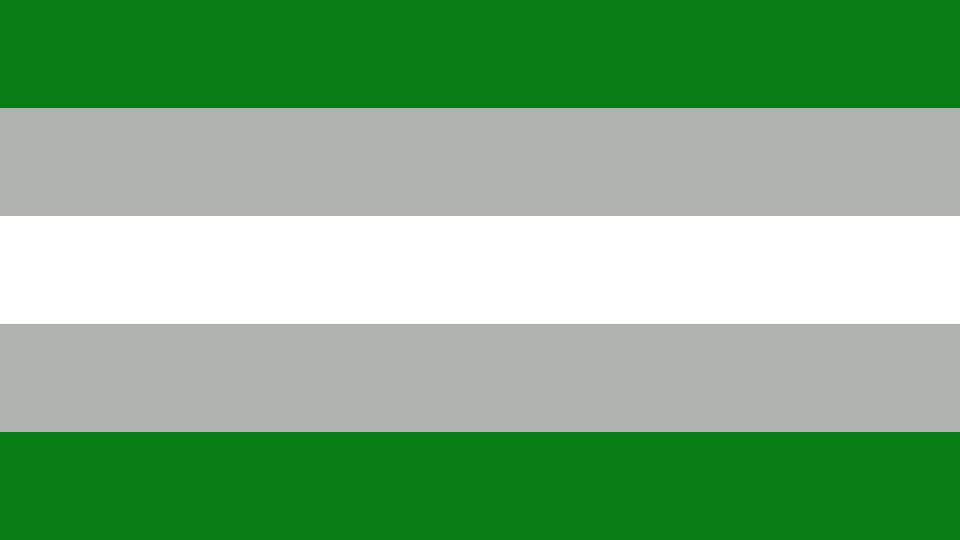
Grayromantic

=== Gender identity–based flags ===
Agender

Bigender

Demiboy

Demigirl

Genderfluid

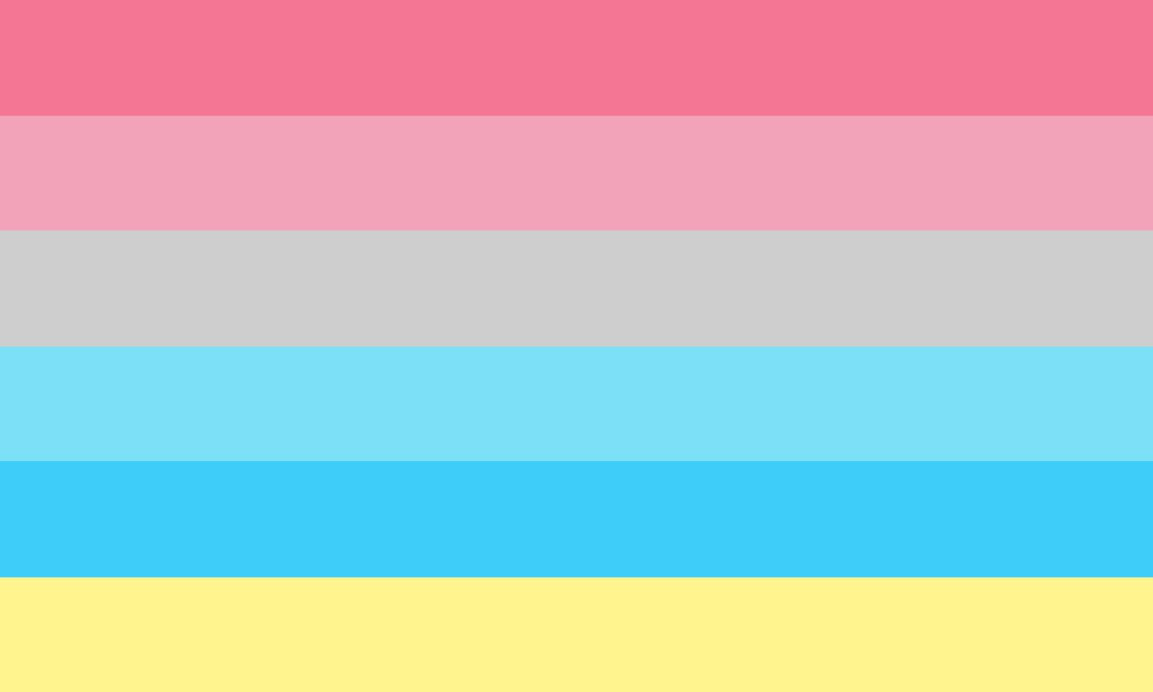
Genderflux

Genderqueer

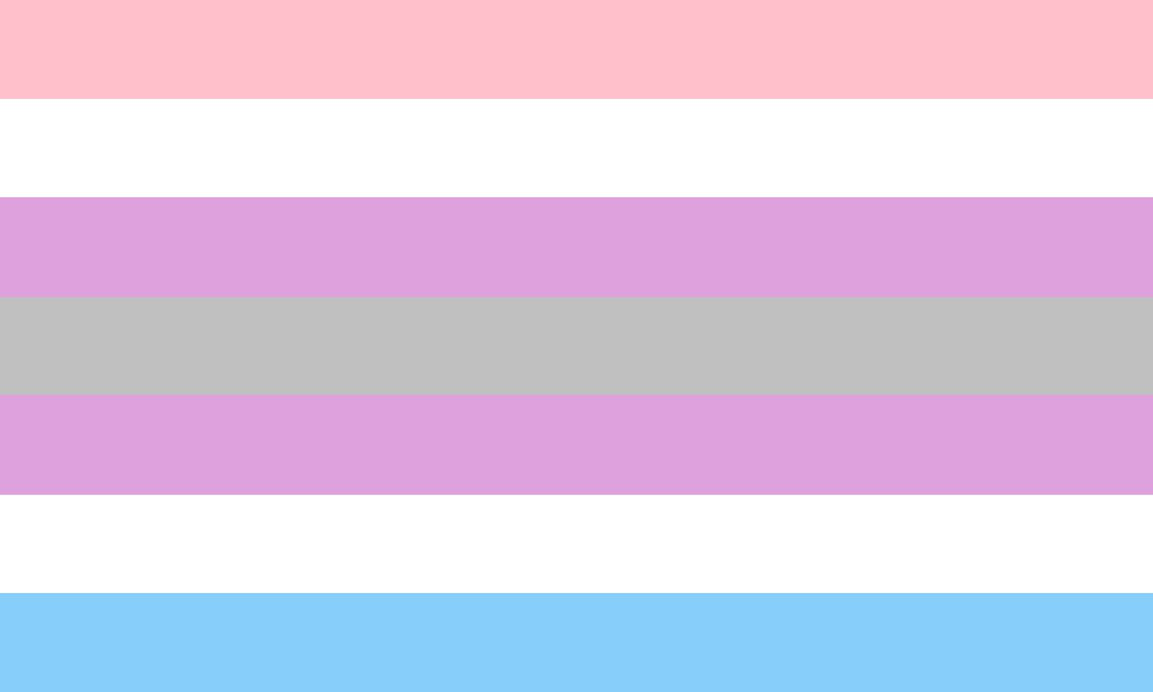
Intergender

Maverique

Neutrois

Non-binary

Pangender

Transgender

Transmasculine

=== Other flags ===
Aroace
(Aromantic–asexual)

Bear

Femboy

Intersex

Intersex-inclusive Progress Pride flag

Leather

Pony

Progress Pride flag

Polyamory (design created in 1995 by Jim Evans)

Polyamory (design created in 2022 by Red Howell)

Queer

Rainbow flag

Rainbow Gadsden flag

Rubber

Two-spirit

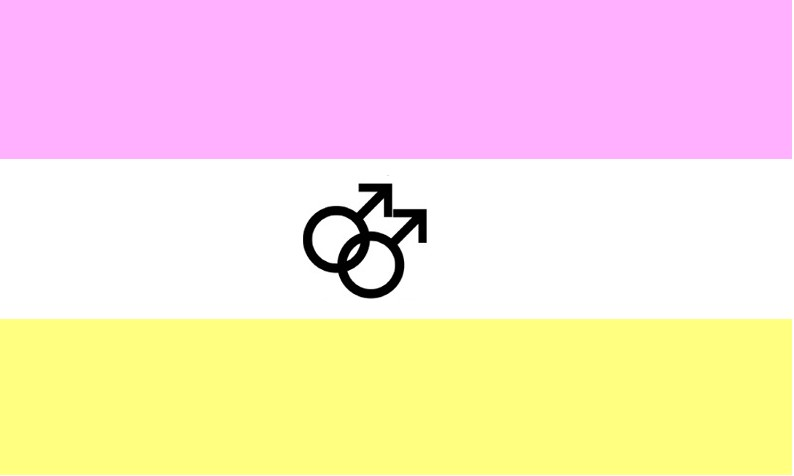
Twink

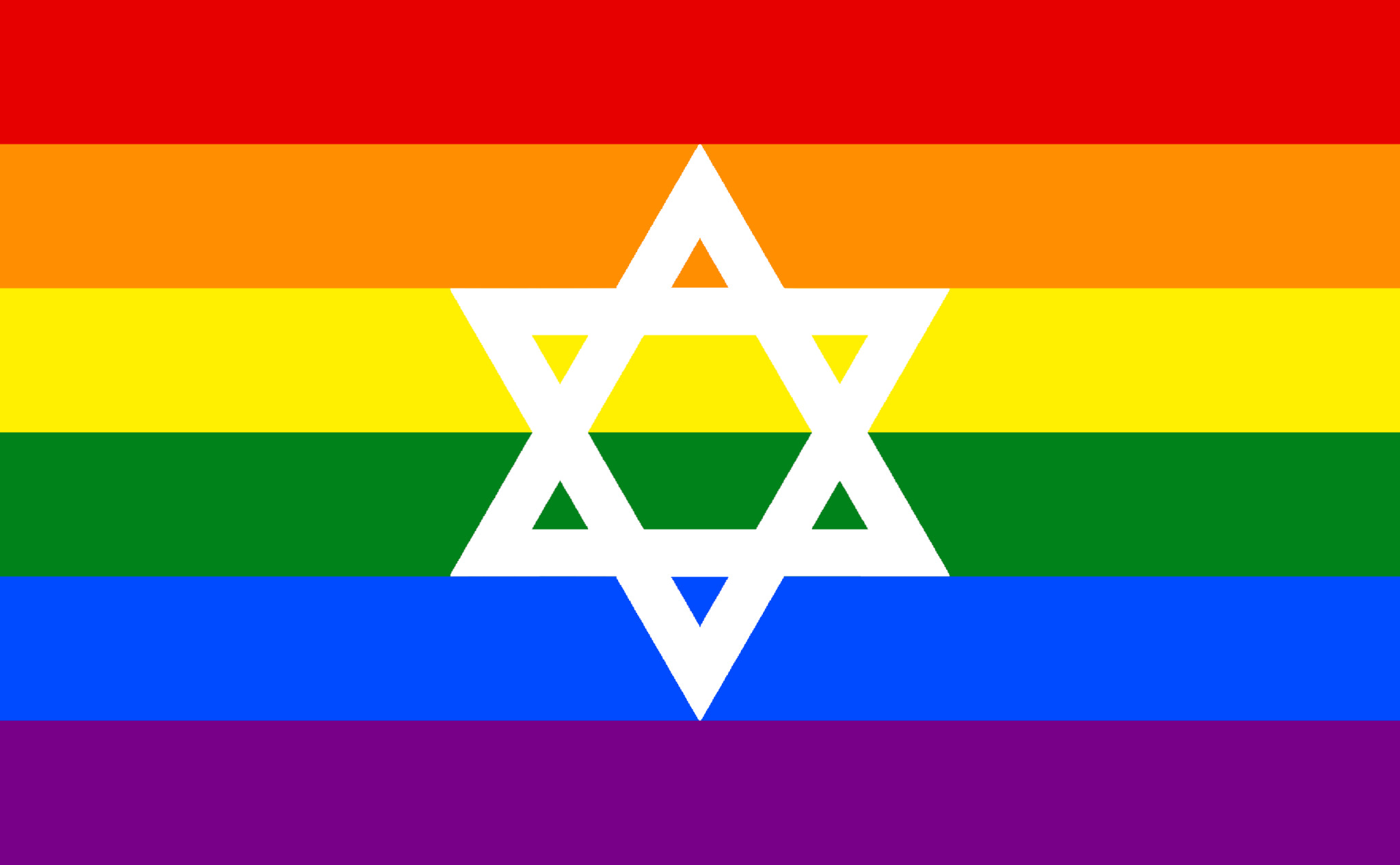
Jewish

=== Location-based flags ===
Belarus

Brazil

Canada
Canadian Pride flag

Israel pride flag

Philadelphia, United States
People of color pride flag

Poland
Gay pride flag of Poland

Salt Lake City, Utah
The Sego Belonging Flag, an official flag of Salt Lake City, Utah, based on the Progress Pride flag. It was adopted in 2025 in response to a new state law restricting the flying of that and other flags.

Sapporo, Japan
Rainbow with white triangle at hoist

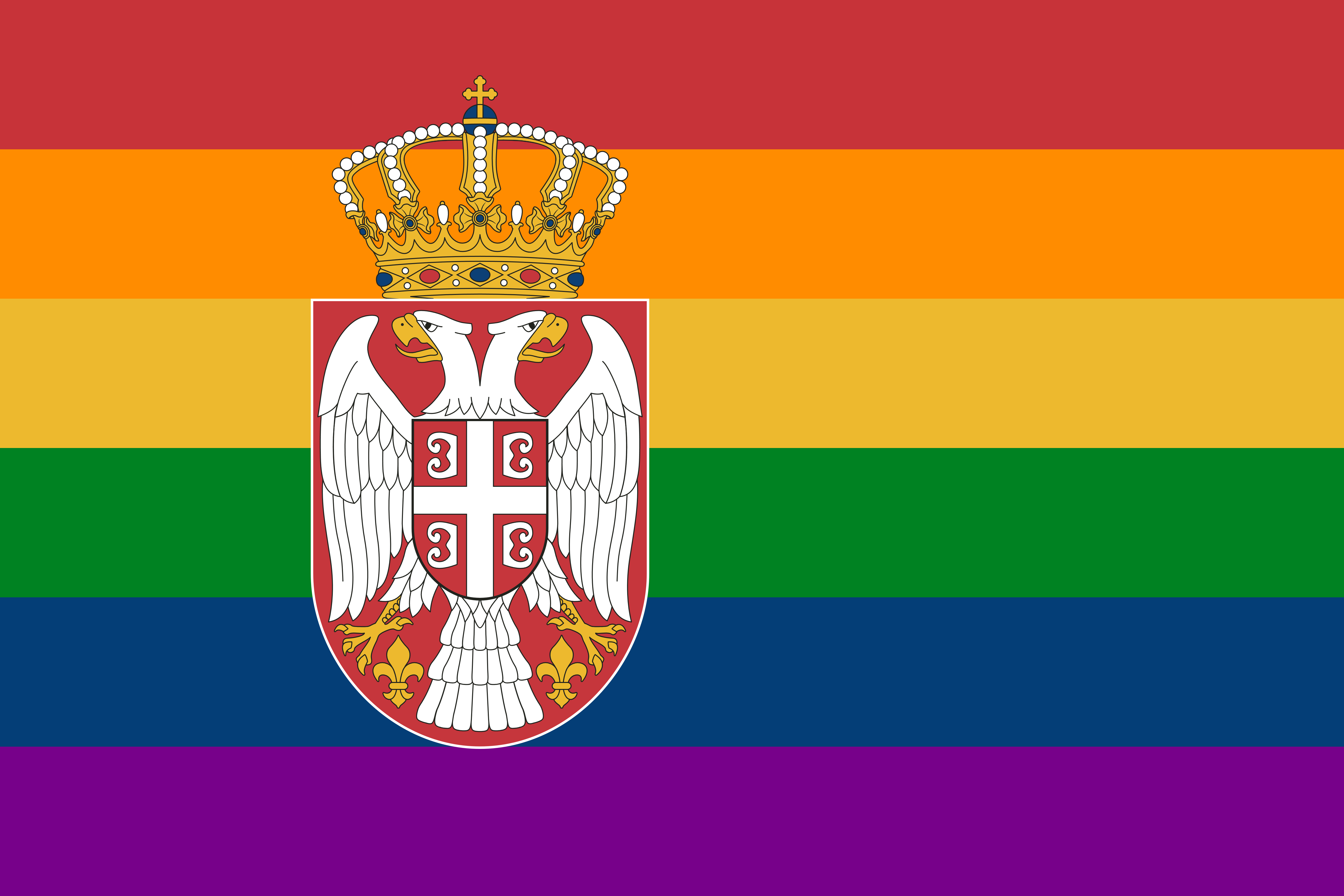
Serbia
Gay pride flag of Serbia

South Africa
Gay flag of South Africa

United Kingdom
Pink Union Jack

United States
United States rainbow flag

== Encoding ==
Unicode name	symbol	hex	dec	Associated wording
MERCURY	☿	U+263F	&#9791;	Intersexuality.
DOUBLED FEMALE SIGN	⚢	U+26A2	&#9890;	Female homosexuality.
DOUBLED MALE SIGN	⚣	U+26A3	&#9891;	Male homosexuality.
INTERLOCKED MALE AND FEMALE SIGN	⚤	U+26A4	&#9892;	Heterosexuality.
MALE AND FEMALE SIGN	⚥	U+26A5	&#9893;	Intersex, androgynous. Hermaphroditic (in botany).
MALE WITH STROKE SIGN	⚦	U+26A6	&#9894;	Transgender.
MALE WITH STROKE AND MALE AND FEMALE SIGN	⚧	U+26A7	&#9895;	Transgender.
NEUTER	⚲	U+26B2	&#9906;	(subheading as a gender symbol)
MEDIUM WHITE CIRCLE	⚪︎	U+26AA	&#9898;	Asexuality, sexless, genderless. Base for male or female sign. (Note: Also used as synonym of U+26AC MEDIUM SMALL WHITE CIRCLE (⚬) Engaged, betrothed (genealogy), wedding ring. Cf. also U+25CB WHITE CIRCLE (○), female in genealogies and pedigrees.)

Many of these symbols have unrelated meanings in other fields, notably as alchemical symbols and planetary symbols.

== See also ==
- LGBTQ slang
- LGBTQ slogans
- Pride flag
