= List of pride flags =

This is a list of commonly used pride flags that are related to LGBTQ identities, community, or culture, along with the symbolism for the designs. A majority of these flags have drawn direct or indirect inspiration from Gilbert Baker's original rainbow design, whether visually, or in the attempt to provide a symbol to reflect the identity and community.

== General pride flags ==
General LGBTQ flags
| Flag | Name | Creator | Year created | Design symbolism | References |
|---|---|---|---|---|---|
| | Gilbert Baker | Gilbert Baker | 1978 | Pink: Sex | |
| | Gilbert Baker | Gilbert Baker | 1978 | Red: Life | |
| | Gilbert Baker | Gilbert Baker | 1978 | Orange: Healing | |
| | Gilbert Baker | Gilbert Baker | 1978 | Yellow: Sunlight | |
| | Gilbert Baker | Gilbert Baker | 1978 | Green: Nature | |
| | Gilbert Baker | Gilbert Baker | 1978 | Turquoise: Magic and art | |
| | Gilbert Baker | Gilbert Baker | 1978 | Indigo: Serenity | |
| | Gilbert Baker | Gilbert Baker | 1978 | Violet: Spirit of the LGBTQ community | |
| | Rainbow | Gilbert Baker | 1979 | Red: Life | |
| | Rainbow | Gilbert Baker | 1979 | Orange: Healing | |
| | Rainbow | Gilbert Baker | 1979 | Yellow: Sunlight | |
| | Rainbow | Gilbert Baker | 1979 | Green: Nature | |
| | Rainbow | Gilbert Baker | 1979 | Blue: Life | |
| | Rainbow | Gilbert Baker | 1979 | Violet: Spirit of the LGBTQ community | |
| | Philadelphia pride | Tierney | 2017 | Black and brown: Queer people of color | |
| | Progress pride | Daniel Quasar | 2018 | Right-pointing chevron: Forward movement Brown: Queer people of color Black: Queer people of color and queer people who died during the HIV/AIDS crisis of the 1990s White, pink, and blue: Transgender community | |
| | Intersex-inclusive progress pride | Valentino Vecchietti | 2021 | Yellow chevron with purple circle: Intersex community | |
| | Queer | | 2015 | Black: Asexual, aromantic, and agender identities | |
| | Queer | | 2015 | Light blue: Same-gender attraction | |
| | Queer | | 2015 | Blue: Same-gender attraction | |
| | Queer | | 2015 | Green: Non-binary and gender-non-conforming people | |
| | Queer | | 2015 | White: Asexual, aromantic, and agender identities | |
| | Queer | | 2015 | Yellow: Non-binary and gender-non-conforming people | |
| | Queer | | 2015 | Peach: Same-gender attraction | |
| | Queer | | 2015 | Light pink: Same-gender attraction | |

== Sexual orientation ==
Sexual orientation pride flags
| Flag | Name | Creator | Year created | Design symbolism | References |
|---|---|---|---|---|---|
| | Lesbian (labrys) | Sean Campbell | 1999 | Purple: Associated with the poetry of Sappho. | |
| | Lesbian (labrys) | Sean Campbell | 1999 | Black triangle: Reclaimed symbol of lesbianism, derived from the black triangle worn by people deemed to be "asocial" in Nazi Germany. | |
| | Lesbian (labrys) | Sean Campbell | 1999 | White labrys (double-headed battle axe): Associated with the Amazons of Greek mythology. | |
| | Lesbian (lipstick) | Natalie McCray | 2010 | | |
| | Lesbian (sunset) | Emily Gwen | c. 2018 | Dark orange: Gender non-conformity | |
| | Lesbian (sunset) | Emily Gwen | c. 2018 | Orange: Independence | |
| | Lesbian (sunset) | Emily Gwen | c. 2018 | Light orange: Community | |
| | Lesbian (sunset) | Emily Gwen | c. 2018 | White: Unique relationships to womanhood | |
| | Lesbian (sunset) | Emily Gwen | c. 2018 | Pink: Serenity and peace | |
| | Lesbian (sunset) | Emily Gwen | c. 2018 | Dusty pink: Love and sex | |
| | Lesbian (sunset) | Emily Gwen | c. 2018 | Dark rose: Femininity | |
| | Gay man | Tumblr user @gayflagblog | 2019 | | |
| | Bisexual | Michael Page | 1998 | Pink: Attraction to the same gender | |
| | Bisexual | Michael Page | 1998 | Purple: Attraction to multiple/non-binary genders | |
| | Bisexual | Michael Page | 1998 | Blue: Attraction to the opposite gender | |
| | Pansexual | | c. 2010 | Magenta: Attraction to women | |
| | Pansexual | | c. 2010 | Yellow: Attraction to non-binary people | |
| | Pansexual | | c. 2010 | Cyan: Attraction to men | |
| | Asexual | AVEN user standup | 2010 | Black: Asexuality | |
| | Asexual | AVEN user standup | 2010 | Gray: Demisexuality and gray-asexuality | |
| | Asexual | AVEN user standup | 2010 | White: Allosexual partners and allies | |
| | Asexual | AVEN user standup | 2010 | Purple: Community | |
| | Demisexual | | | Black: Asexuality | |
| | Demisexual | | | White: Sexuality | |
| | Demisexual | | | Purple: Community | |
| | Demisexual | | | Gray: Demisexuality | |
| | Gray-asexual | Milith Rusignuolo | 2013 | Purple: Asexuality | |
| | Gray-asexual | Milith Rusignuolo | 2013 | Gray: Spectrum between asexuality and allosexuality | |
| | Gray-asexual | Milith Rusignuolo | 2013 | White: Allosexuality and allies | |
| | Polysexual | Tumblr user @Samlin | 2012 | Pink: Attraction to women | |
| | Polysexual | Tumblr user @Samlin | 2012 | Green: Attraction to non-binary people | |
| | Polysexual | Tumblr user @Samlin | 2012 | Blue: Attraction to men | |
| | Achillean/MLM | Tumblr user @DeviantArt | 2016 | Light blue: Men | |
| | Achillean/MLM | Tumblr user @DeviantArt | 2016 | Lime-green carnation: A symbol for gay men popularized by Oscar Wilde | |
| | Omnisexual | Tumblr user @pastelroswell | 2015 | Light pink: Gender spectrum | |
| | Omnisexual | Tumblr user @pastelroswell | 2015 | Pink: Attraction to women and femininity | |
| | Omnisexual | Tumblr user @pastelroswell | 2015 | Dark purple: Attraction to non-binary people | |
| | Omnisexual | Tumblr user @pastelroswell | 2015 | Blue: Attraction to men and masculinity | |
| | Omnisexual | Tumblr user @pastelroswell | 2015 | Light blue: Gender spectrum | |
| | Pomosexual | Tumblr user @pride-color-schemes | 2016 | | |
| | Sapphic | Tumblr user @pride-color-schemes | 2017 | Pink: Love | |
| | Sapphic | Tumblr user @pride-color-schemes | 2017 | Violet: This flower has been traditionally gifted between women to represent their sapphic love | |
| | Abrosexual | Tumblr user @ModChad | 2013 | | |

== Romantic orientation ==
Romantic orientation pride flags
| Flag | Identity | Creator | Year created | Design symbolism | References |
|---|---|---|---|---|---|
| | Aromantic | Tumblr user @CameronWhimsy | 2015 | Dark green: Lack of romance | |
| | Aromantic | Tumblr user @CameronWhimsy | 2015 | Light green: Aromantic spectrum | |
| | Aromantic | Tumblr user @CameronWhimsy | 2015 | White: Platonic, aesthetic, and queerplatonic relationships | |
| | Aromantic | Tumblr user @CameronWhimsy | 2015 | Gray: Demiromantic people | |
| | Aromantic | Tumblr user @CameronWhimsy | 2015 | Black: Sexuality spectrum | |
| | Demiromantic | Tumblr user @QueerAsCat | 2015 | Black chevron: Sexuality spectrum | |
| | Demiromantic | Tumblr user @QueerAsCat | 2015 | White: Platonic, aesthetic, and queerplatonic relationships | |
| | Demiromantic | Tumblr user @QueerAsCat | 2015 | Green: Lack of romance | |
| | Demiromantic | Tumblr user @QueerAsCat | 2015 | Light gray: Demiromantic people | |
| | Grayromantic | Tumblr user @QueerAsCat | 2015 | | |

== Gender identity ==
Gender identity and expression pride flags
| Flag | Identity | Creator | Year created | Design symbolism | References |
|---|---|---|---|---|---|
| | Transgender | Monica Helms | c. 1999 | Blue: Traditional color for baby boys | |
| | Transgender | Monica Helms | c. 1999 | Pink: Traditional color for baby girls | |
| | Transgender | Monica Helms | c. 1999 | White: People who are transitioning, non-binary, intersex, or have an undefined gender | |
| | Non-binary | Kye Rowan | 2014 | Yellow: People who do not identify as either binary gender or identify outside of the gender binary | |
| | Non-binary | Kye Rowan | 2014 | White: People with multiple or all genders (multigender or pangender) | |
| | Non-binary | Kye Rowan | 2014 | Purple: People who identify as both male and female or in-between male and female | |
| | Non-binary | Kye Rowan | 2014 | Black: People with no gender (agender) | |
| | Genderfluid | JJ Poole | c. 2012 | Pink: Femininity | |
| | Genderfluid | JJ Poole | c. 2012 | White: Lack of gender | |
| | Genderfluid | JJ Poole | c. 2012 | Purple: Androgyny | |
| | Genderfluid | JJ Poole | c. 2012 | Black: All genders | |
| | Genderfluid | JJ Poole | c. 2012 | Blue: Masculinity | |
| | Genderqueer | Marilyn Roxie | 2011 | Lavender: Androgyny and bigender identity | |
| | Genderqueer | Marilyn Roxie | 2011 | White: Agender identity | |
| | Genderqueer | Marilyn Roxie | 2011 | Chartreuse: People who identify outside of the gender binary | |
| | Agender | Salem X | 2014 | Black: Absence of gender | |
| | Agender | Salem X | 2014 | Gray: Semi-genderless people | |
| | Agender | Salem X | 2014 | White: Absence of gender | |
| | Agender | Salem X | 2014 | Green: Non-binary people | |
| | Two-Spirit | Tumblr user @2Sanon | 2016 | Feathers: Masculine and feminine identities Circle: Unification of masculine and feminine identities into a separate gender | |

== Other flags ==
Other pride flags
| Flag | Name | Creator | Year created | Design symbolism | References |
|---|---|---|---|---|---|
| | Intersex | Morgan Carpenter | 2013 | Yellow: Ungenderedness/gender neutrality | |
| | Intersex | Morgan Carpenter | 2013 | Purple circle: Ungenderedness/gender neutrality, wholeness | |
| | Pride of Africa | Pride of Africa Foundation | 2019 | | |
| | Queer and trans people of color | | | Raised clenched fist: Solidarity with the Black Lives Matter movement | |
| | Polyamorous | Jim Evans | 1995 | Blue: Openness and honesty within a polyamorous relationship | |
| | Polyamorous | Jim Evans | 1995 | Red: Love and passion | |
| | Polyamorous | Jim Evans | 1995 | Gold pi: Valuable emotional attachment to one's partners and infinite options for partners | |
| | Polyamorous | Jim Evans | 1995 | Black: Solidarity in having to hide one's polyamorous relationship | |
| | Polyamorous | Red Howell | 2021 | White: Possibility | |
| | Polyamorous | Red Howell | 2021 | Gold: Energy and perseverance | |
| | Polyamorous | Red Howell | 2021 | Blue: Openness and honesty | |
| | Polyamorous | Red Howell | 2021 | Magenta: Desire and love | |
| | Polyamorous | Red Howell | 2021 | Dark purple: United community | |
| | Leather | Tony DeBlase | 1989 | Black: Leather | |
| | Leather | Tony DeBlase | 1989 | Blue: Denim | |
| | Leather | Tony DeBlase | 1989 | White: Purity and safety | |
| | Leather | Tony DeBlase | 1989 | Red heart: Love | |
| | Bear | Craig Byrnes and Paul Witzkoske | 1995 | Bear fur colors | |
| | Straight ally | | | Rainbow-striped chevron: "A" shape Black and white stripes: Heterosexual and cisgender people | |
| | Aroace | Tumblr user @aroaesflags | 2018 | | |
| | Rubber | Peter Tolos and Scott Moats | 1995 | Black: Leather | |
| | Rubber | Peter Tolos and Scott Moats | 1995 | Red: "Blood passion" for rubber | |
| | Rubber | Peter Tolos and Scott Moats | 1995 | Yellow: Drive for and fantasies of rubber play | |
| | Drag | Veranda L'Ni | 2016 | Purple: Passion for drag | |
| | Drag | Veranda L'Ni | 2016 | White: The blank slate a body becomes when creating a drag character | |
| | Drag | Veranda L'Ni | 2016 | Blue: Self-expression and loyalty | |
| | Drag | Veranda L'Ni | 2016 | Pink crown: Leadership within the drag community Pink stars: The many different forms of drag | |
