= Pride flag =

Symbol for the LGBTQ community

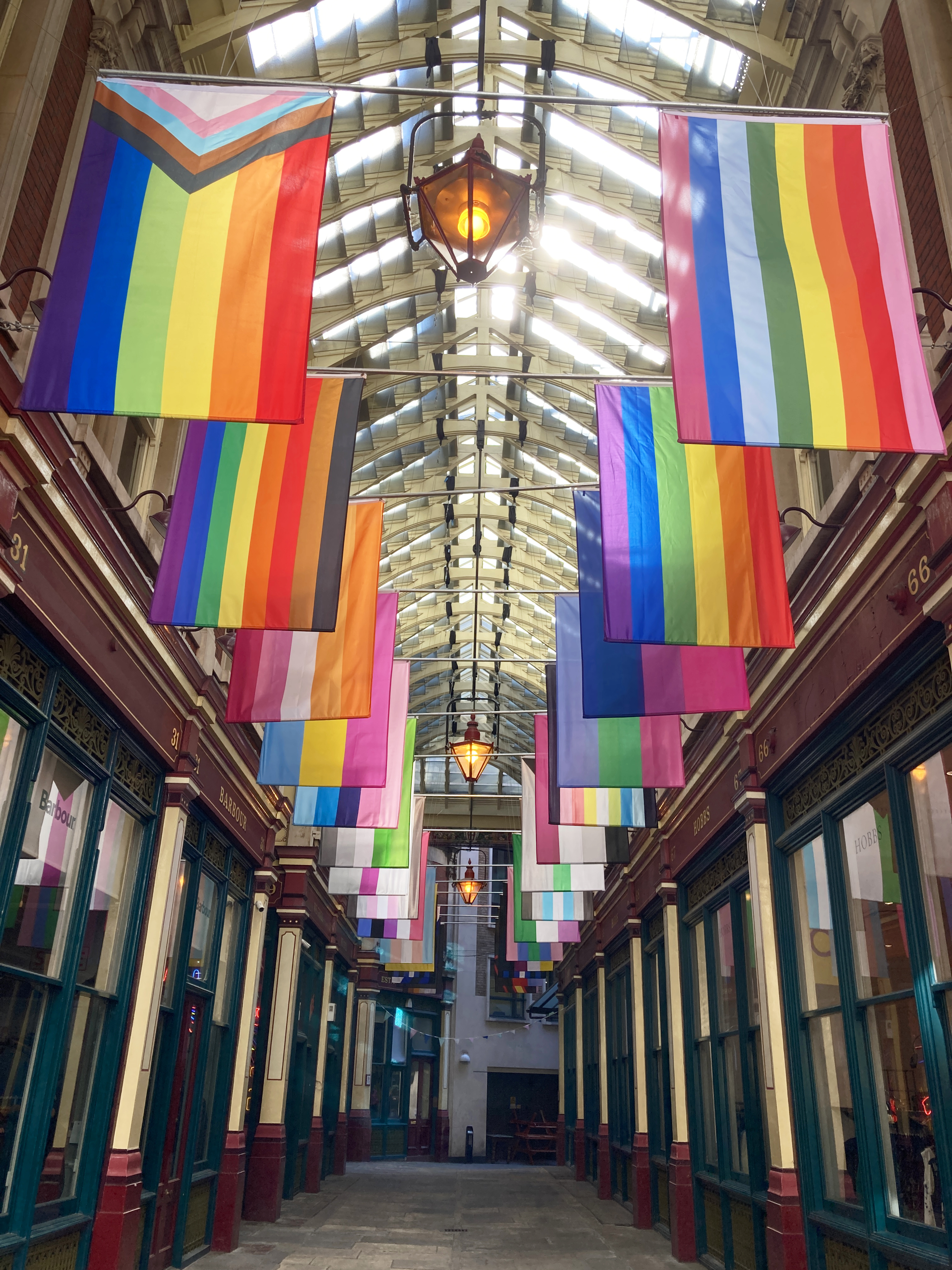
A collection of pride flags hanging in London's Leadenhall Market, 2021.

A pride flag is any flag that represents a segment or part of the LGBTQ community. Pride in this case refers to the notion of LGBTQ pride. The terms LGBTQ flag and queer flag are also often used interchangeably.

The rainbow flag, which represents the entire LGBTQ community, is the most widely used pride flag. Pride flags can represent various sexual orientations, romantic orientations, gender identities, subcultures, and regional purposes. Some pride flags, however, are not exclusively related to LGBTQ communities, such as the flag for leather subculture.

Numerous communities have embraced distinct flags, with a majority drawing inspiration from the rainbow flag. These flags are often created by amateur designers and later gain traction online or within affiliated organizations, ultimately attaining a semi-official status as a symbolic representation of the community. Typically, these flags incorporate a range of colors that symbolize different aspects of the associated communities.

== Notable examples ==
=== Rainbow ===
Gilbert Baker designed the rainbow pride flag for the 1978 San Francisco Gay Freedom Day celebration. The flag was designed as a "symbol of hope" and liberation, and an alternative to the symbolism of the pink triangle. The flag does not depict an actual rainbow. Rather, the colors of the rainbow are displayed as horizontal stripes, with red at the top and violet at the bottom. In the original eight-color version, pink stood for sexuality, red for life, orange for healing, yellow for the sun, green for nature, turquoise for art, indigo for harmony, and violet for spirit. A copy of the original 20-by-30 foot, eight-color flag was made by Baker in 2000 and was installed in the Castro district in San Francisco.

Many variations on the rainbow flag exist, including ones incorporating other LGBTQ symbols like the triangle or lambda. In 2018, designer Daniel Quasar created a modified version of the rainbow pride flag, incorporating elements of other flags to bring focus on inclusion and progress. This flag is known as the Progress Pride flag. In 2021, Valentino Vecchietti of Intersex Equality Rights UK redesigned the Progress Pride flag to incorporate the intersex flag.

Original eight-stripe version designed by Gilbert Baker (1978)

Seven-stripe version with hot pink color removed due to a lack of fabric (1978)

Six-stripe version with turquoise color removed and indigo color changed to royal blue (1979)

Gilbert Baker's nine-stripe pride flag with a lavender stripe added at the top to represent diversity (2017)

Daniel Quasar's Progress variant of the rainbow pride flag (2018)

Valentino Vecchietti's intersex-inclusive Progress Pride flag (2021)

=== Aromanticism ===
Aromantic flag

The aromantic pride flag consists of five horizontal stripes, which are (from top to bottom) green, light green, white, gray, and black. The flag was created by Cameron Whimsy in 2014. The green and light green stripes represent aromanticism and the aro-spectrum. The white stripe represents the importance and validity of non-romantic forms of love, which include friendship, platonic and aesthetic attraction, queerplatonic relationships, and family. The black and gray stripes represent the sexuality spectrum, which ranges from aro-aces (aromantic asexuals) to aromantic allosexuals.

=== Asexuality ===
Asexual flag

The asexual pride flag consists of four horizontal stripes: black, gray, white, and purple from top to bottom. The flag was created by an Asexual Visibility and Education Network user standup in August 2010, as part of a community effort to create and choose a flag. The black stripe represents asexuality; the gray stripe represents gray-asexuals and demisexuals; the white stripe represents allies; and the purple stripe represents community.

=== Bisexuality ===
Bisexual flag

Introduced on December 5, 1998, the bisexual pride flag was designed by activist Michael Page to represent and increase the visibility of bisexual people in the LGBTQ community and society as a whole. Page chose a combination of Pantone Matching System (PMS) colors magenta (pink), lavender (purple), and royal (blue). The finished rectangular flag consists of a broad pink stripe at the top, a broad stripe in blue at the bottom, and a narrow purple stripe in the center.

Page described the meaning of the colors as, "The pink color represents sexual attraction to the same sex only (gay and lesbian), the blue represents sexual attraction to the opposite sex only (straight) and the resultant overlap color purple represents sexual attraction to both sexes (bi)." He also described the flag's meaning in deeper terms, stating "The key to understanding the symbolism in the Bi Pride Flag is to know that the purple pixels of color blend unnoticeably into both the pink and blue, just as in the 'real world' where bi people blend unnoticeably into both the gay/lesbian and straight communities."

The biangles, designed by Liz Nania, from which Michael Page stated that he took the colors and overlap for the bisexual pride flag

Page stated that he took the colors and overlap for the flag from the biangles, overlapping blue and pink triangles that represent bisexuality. The biangles were designed by artist Liz Nania as she co-organized a bisexual contingent for the Second National March on Washington for Lesbian and Gay Rights in 1987. The design of the biangles began with the pink triangle, a Nazi concentration camp badge that later became a symbol of gay liberation representing homosexuality. The addition of a blue triangle contrasts the pink and represents heterosexuality. The two triangles overlap and form lavender, which represents the "queerness of bisexuality", referencing the Lavender Menace and 1980s and 1990s associations of lavender with queerness.

=== Gay men ===
Gay man flag

Various pride flags have been used to symbolize gay men. Rainbow flags have been used since 1978 to represent both gay men and, subsequently, the LGBTQ community as a whole. Since the 2010s, various designs have been proposed to specifically represent the gay male community, the one shown here being the most common today.

=== Intersex ===
Intersex flag

The intersex flag was created by Morgan Carpenter of Intersex Human Rights Australia in July 2013 to create a flag "that is not derivative, but is yet firmly grounded in meaning". The organization describes the circle as:

"unbroken and unornamented, symbolising wholeness and completeness, and our potentialities. We are still fighting for bodily autonomy and genital integrity, and this symbolises the right to be who and how we want to be".

=== Lesbian ===
No single design for a lesbian-pride flag has been widely adopted. However, many popular ones exist.

The labrys lesbian flag was created in 1999 by graphic designer Sean Campbell, and published in June 2000 in the Palm Springs edition of the Gay and Lesbian Times Pride issue. The design involves a labrys, a type of double-headed axe, superimposed on the inverted black triangle, set against a violet background. Among its functions, the labrys was associated as a weapon used by the Amazons of mythology. In the 1970s it was adopted as a symbol of empowerment by the lesbian feminist community. Women considered asocial by Nazi Germany for not conforming to the Nazi ideal of a woman, which included homosexual females, were condemned to concentration camps and wore an inverted black triangle badge to identify them. Some lesbians reclaimed this symbol as gay men reclaimed the pink triangle (many lesbians also reclaimed the pink triangle although lesbians were not included in Paragraph 175 of the German criminal code). The color violet became associated with lesbians via the poetry of Sappho.

The lipstick lesbian flag was introduced by Natalie McCray in 2010 in the weblog This Lesbian Life. The design contains a red kiss in the left corner, superimposed on seven stripes consisting of six shades of red and pink colors and a white bar in the center. The lipstick lesbian flag represents "homosexual women who have a more feminine gender expression", but has not been widely adopted. Some lesbians are against it because it does not include butch lesbians, while others have accused McCray of writing biphobic, racist, and transphobic comments on her blog.

The "pink" lesbian flag was derived from the lipstick lesbian flag but with the kiss mark removed. The pink flag attracted more use as a general lesbian pride flag.

The "orange-pink" lesbian flag, modeled after the seven-band pink flag, was introduced on Tumblr by blogger Emily Gwen in 2018. The colors include dark orange for "gender non-conformity", orange for "independence", light orange for "community", white for "unique relationships to womanhood", pink for "serenity and peace", dusty pink for "love and sex", and dark rose for "femininity". A five-stripes version was soon derived from the 2018 colors.

Labrys lesbian flag created in 1999 by Sean Campbell

The lipstick lesbian flag was introduced in 2010 by Natalie McCray; this is a version with the kiss symbol changed.

Pink lesbian flag with colors copied from the lipstick lesbian flag

Orange-pink lesbian flag derived from the pink lesbian flag, circulated on social media in 2018, and the most popular lesbian flag in use today.

Five-stripes variant of orange-pink flag

Variant of the rainbow pride flag with the double-Venus symbol

=== Non-binary ===
Non-binary flag

The non-binary pride flag was created in 2014 by Kye Rowan. Each stripe color represents different types of non-binary identities: yellow for people who identify outside of the gender binary, white for non-binary people with multiple genders, purple for those with a mixture of both male and female genders, and black for agender individuals.

=== Pansexuality ===
Pansexual flag

The pansexual pride flag was introduced in October 2010 in a Tumblr blog. It has three horizontal bars that are pink, yellow and blue. "The pink represents being attracted to women, the blue being attracted to men, and the yellow for being attracted to everyone else"; such as non-binary gender identities.

=== Transgender ===
Transgender flag

The transgender pride flag was designed by transgender woman Monica Helms in 1999. It was first publicly displayed at a pride parade in Phoenix, Arizona, US, in 2000. It was flown from a large public flagpole in San Francisco's Castro District beginning November 19, 2012, in commemoration of the Transgender Day of Remembrance. The flag represents the transgender community and consists of five horizontal stripes: two light blue, two pink, with a white stripe in the center. Helms described the meaning of the flag as follows:

The stripes at the top and bottom are light blue, the traditional color for baby boys. The stripes next to them are pink, the traditional color for baby girls. The white stripe is for people that are nonbinary, feel that they don't have a gender. The pattern is such that no matter which way you fly it, it is always correct, signifying us finding correctness in our lives.

Philadelphia became the first county government in the United States to raise the transgender pride flag in 2015. It was raised at City Hall in honor of Philadelphia's 14th Annual Trans Health Conference, and remained next to the US and City of Philadelphia flags for the entirety of the conference. Then-Mayor Michael Nutter gave a speech in honor of the trans community's acceptance in Philadelphia.

== Gallery ==
=== Sexual orientation–based flags ===
Aceflux

Achillean

Abrosexual

Asexual

Bisexual

Demisexual

Gay men

Gay men (five stripes)

Gray asexual/graysexual

Labrys lesbian/
lesbian feminist

Lipstick lesbian
(Illustration of original)

Lesbian (up to 2018)

Lesbian
(since 2018; seven stripes)

Lesbian
(since 2018; five stripes)

Omnisexual

Pansexual

Polysexual

Sapphic

=== Romantic attraction–based flags ===
Aromantic

Demiromantic

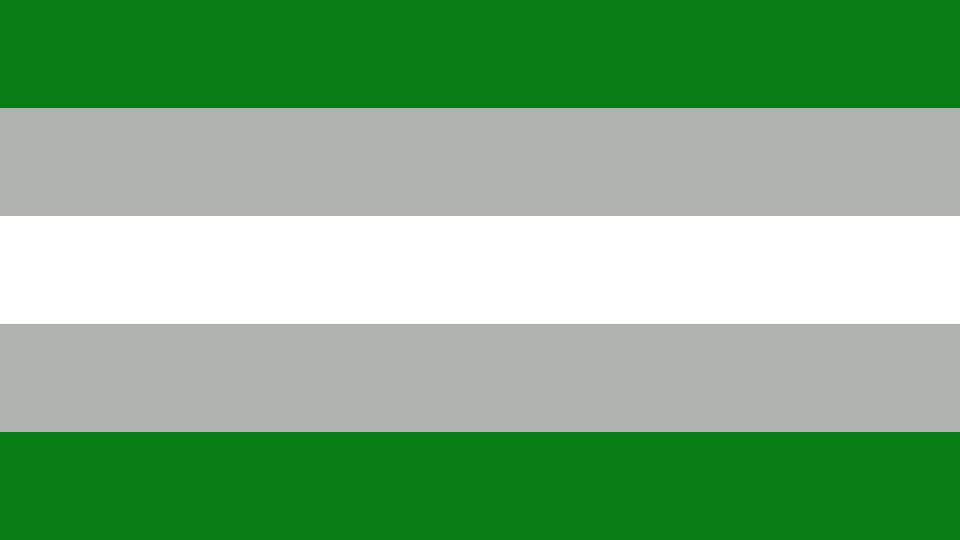
Grayromantic

=== Gender identity–based flags ===
Agender

Bigender

Demiboy

Demigirl

Genderfluid

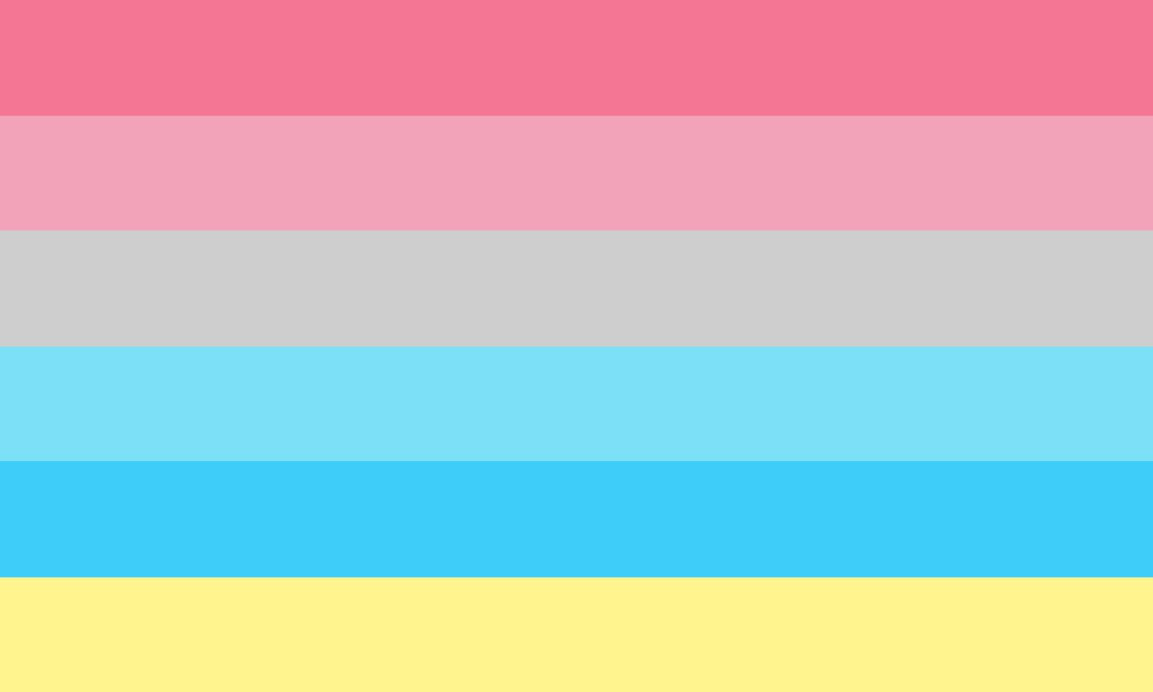
Genderflux

Genderqueer

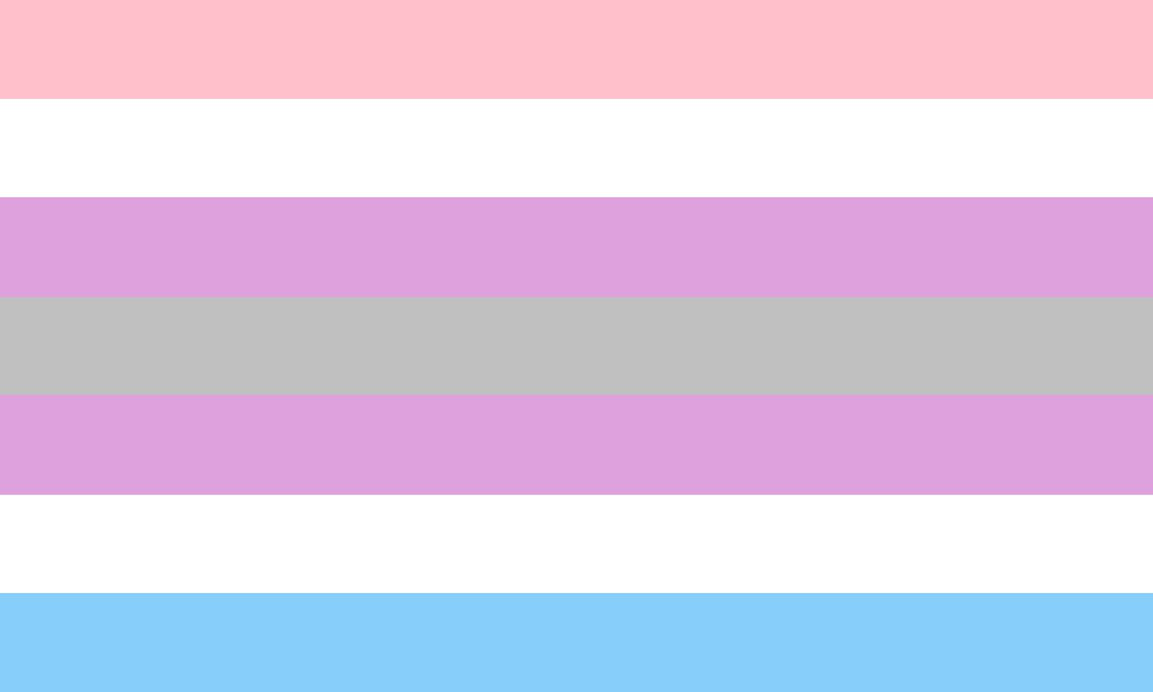
Intergender

Maverique

Neutrois

Non-binary

Pangender

Transgender

Transmasculine

=== Other flags ===
Aroace
(Aromantic–asexual)

Bear

Femboy

Intersex

Intersex-inclusive Progress Pride flag

Leather

Pony

Progress Pride flag

Polyamory (design created in 1995 by Jim Evans)

Polyamory (design created in 2022 by Red Howell)

Queer

Rainbow flag

Rainbow Gadsden flag

Rubber

Two-spirit

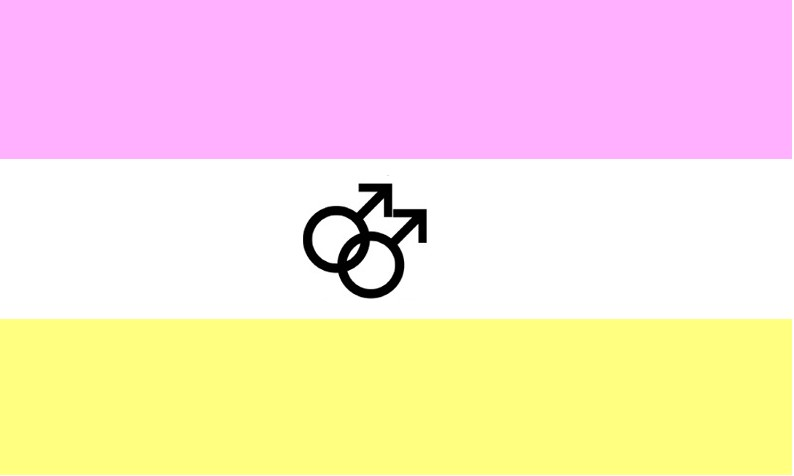
Twink

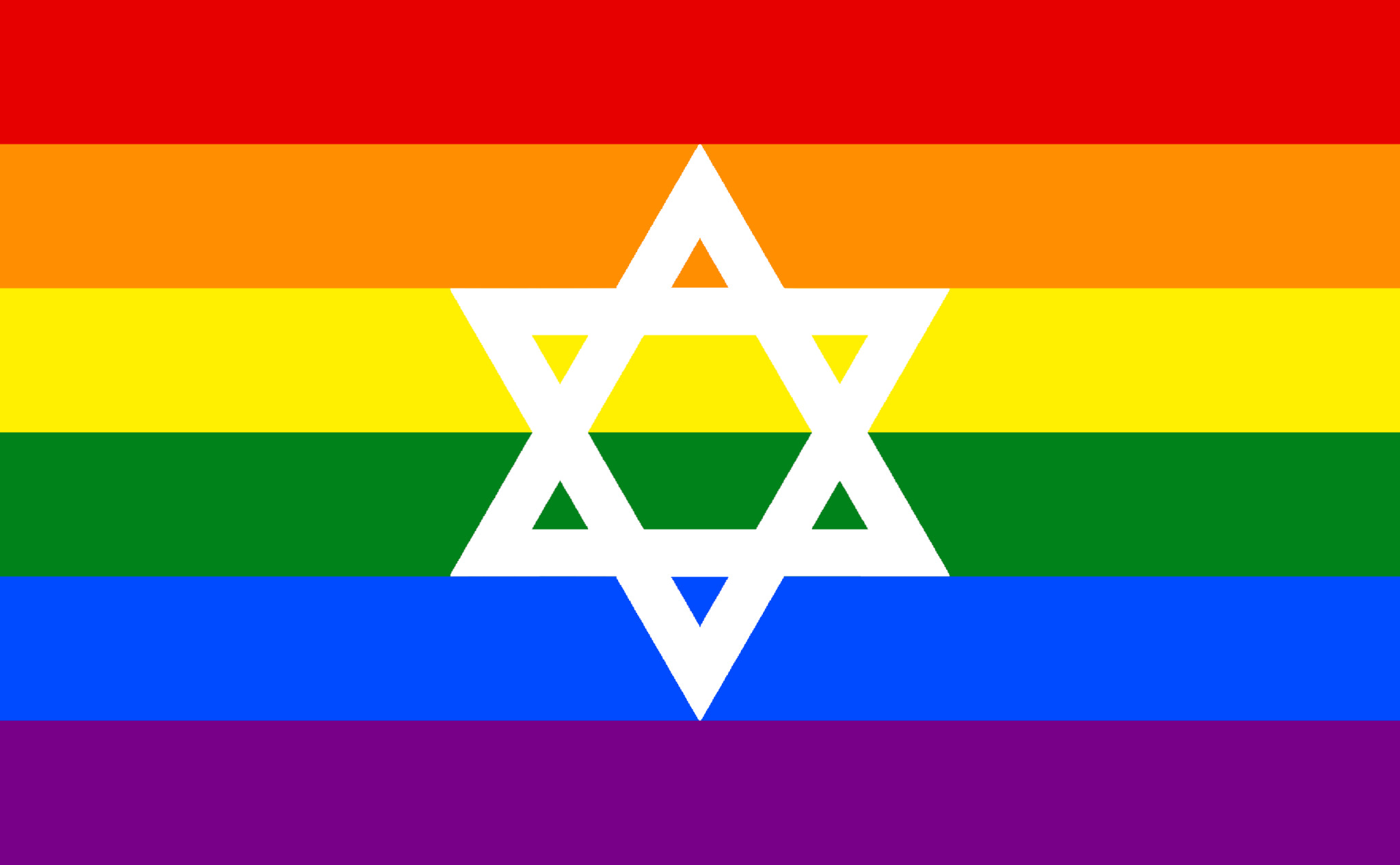
Jewish

=== Location-based flags ===
Belarus

Brazil

Canada
Canadian Pride flag

Israel pride flag

Philadelphia, United States
People of color pride flag

Poland
Gay pride flag of Poland

Salt Lake City, Utah
The Sego Belonging Flag, an official flag of Salt Lake City, Utah, based on the Progress Pride flag. It was adopted in 2025 in response to a new state law restricting the flying of that and other flags.

Sapporo, Japan
Rainbow with white triangle at hoist

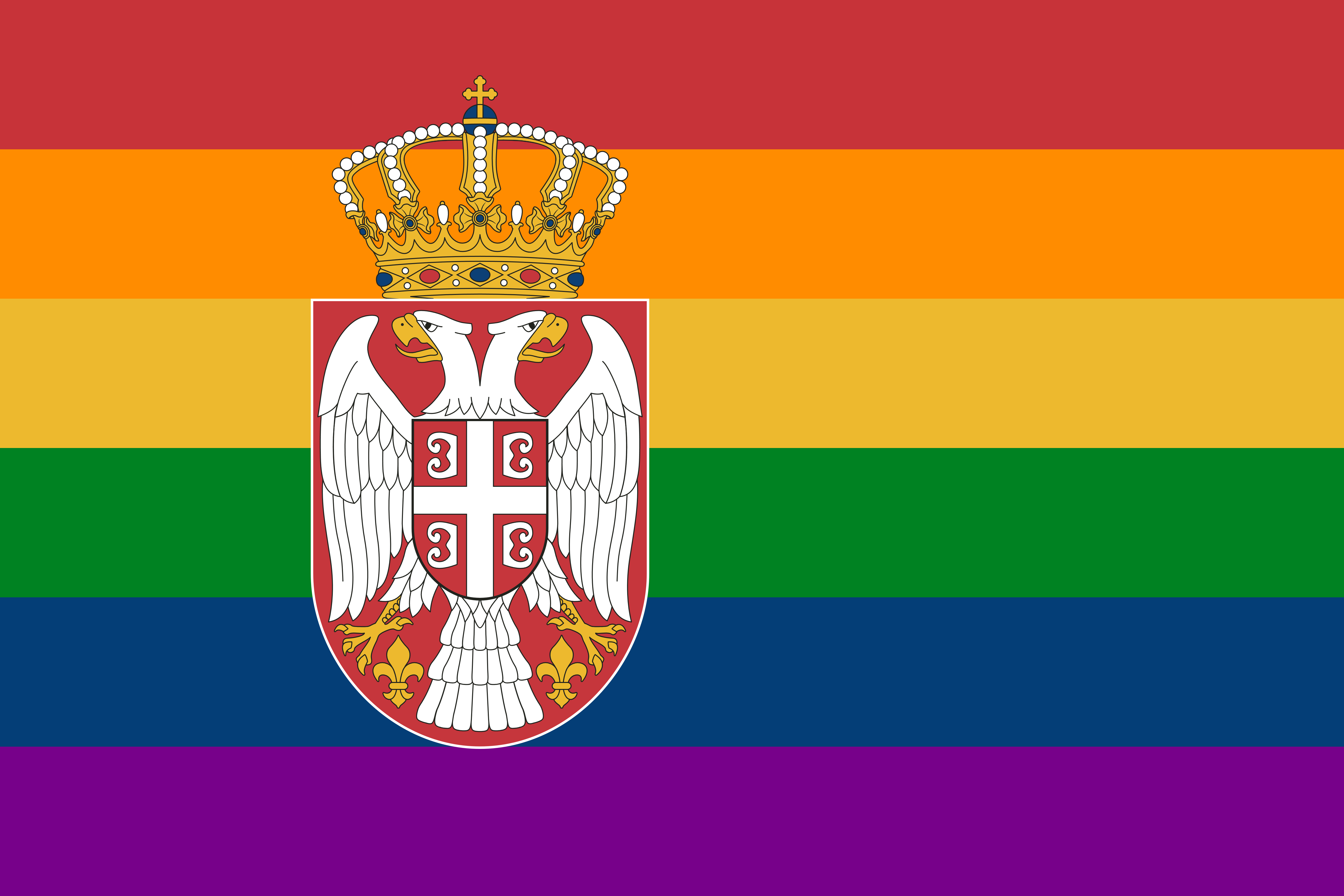
Serbia
Gay pride flag of Serbia

South Africa
Gay flag of South Africa

United Kingdom
Pink Union Jack

United States
United States rainbow flag

== Unicode ==
The sequence U+1F3F3 🏳 WAVING WHITE FLAG, U+FE0F ️ VARIATION SELECTOR-16, U+200D ZERO WIDTH JOINER, U+1F308 🌈 RAINBOW produces a rainbow flag emoji 🏳️‍🌈, but adding more flags has been recommended against and as of 2022, "the Emoji Subcommittee is no longer taking in any proposals for flags of any kind" and proposes to add a pink heart, a light blue heart, and a gray heart emoji to allow many pride flags (as well as sports teams and regional flags) to be represented as sequences of colored hearts.

== See also ==
- Disability Pride flag
- LGBTQ symbols
