= LGBTQ organizations =

Lesbian, gay, bisexual, transgender, queer (LGBTQ) organizations may refer to LGBTQ rights organizations or to groups formed for other purposes:

- LGBTQ rights organization
- List of LGBTQ-related organizations
- List of LGBTQ rights organizations, organizations whose primary mission is campaigning for LGBTQ rights

== See also ==
- PFLAG (disambiguation)
