= Progress Pride flag =

Rainbow flag with a five stripe chevron along the hoist

- Progress Pride flag
- Adopted: 2018; 8 years ago
- Designed by: Daniel Quasar

The Progress Pride flag is a variant of the LGBTQ rainbow flag that includes additional colored stripes representing transgender people and people of color, inspired by the Philadelphia pride flag. The white, light blue and light pink colors of the flag represent transgender people, and the brown and black colors represent people of color and the anti-racism movement. The flag's yellow color stripe is also used to include people living with HIV/AIDS.

Other similar variants have emerged to include other minority groups, such as intersex people, sex workers, people with disabilities, among others.

The Progress Flag was designed in 2018 by Daniel Quasar, an American non-binary queer artist and graphic designer. Progress pride flags are seen at LGBTQ parades, at events during Pride Month, or on commemorative dates such as International LGBTQ Pride Day and the International Day Against Homophobia, Transphobia and Biphobia, used by LGBTQ organizations and activists, such as the Aliança Nacional LGBTI in Brazil.

== History and usage ==
Philadelphia Pride Flag, designed by AJ Hikes

Over the years, the pride flag has been renewed several times. In 2017, AJ Hikes created a pride flag variant with black and brown colors to include racial diversity under the umbrella of "pride." According to NBC News, AJ said that "It's a push for people to start listening to the people of color in our community, start hearing what they're saying, and really to believe them and to step up and say, 'What can I do to help eradicate these issues in our community?'". Before AJ's flag, there was the QPOC (queer person of color) flag, which includes a raised fist in various skin colors, showing solidarity with the Black Lives Matter movement.

In 2018, Daniel Quasar updated the flag to include the colors of the flags designed by AJ Hikes and Monica Helms. The black stripe was previously used to represent "those living with or whose lives have been lost to HIV/AIDS", in the Victory over AIDS Flag, designed in the 1980s.

According to Daniel Quasar:

This new design forces the viewer to reflect on their own feelings towards the original Pride flag and its meaning, as well as the differing opinions on who that flag really represents, while also bringing into clear focus the current needs within our community.

— Daniel Quasar

Intersex-inclusive pride flag

In 2021, Valentino Vecchietti of Intersex Equality Rights UK, adapted the design of the Progress Pride flag to incorporate the intersex flag, creating this Intersex-Inclusive Pride flag, posting it via Twitter and Instagram. It includes a yellow triangle and a purple circle, to reflect the intersex community, and was adopted as the new pride flag after going viral on the internet. This flag appeared at the 27th Copacabana Pride Parade.

The flag has also been used by companies and entities such as Microsoft and the São Paulo Museum of Art.

== Reception ==
The reception to the flags was mixed. Supporters praised the focus on inclusion and the highlighting of the role and discrimination faced by people of color within the LGBTQ community. On the other hand, some expressed concern that the changes acted merely as a "performance, creating the impression of inclusion without real commitment," or that they were "for branding purposes," though they did not reflect any "real material steps toward real equality." Others remained critical, arguing that the original design already acts as a symbol of unity, and emphasized that the original flag was designed without any racial dimension in mind. Other critics called the variations "paternalistic" and said they took away some "universality." The Philadelphia pride flag has received specific criticism for historical disregard of the Victory Over AIDS flag, which featured a black stripe at the bottom of the flag representing triumph over AIDS. Both the Philadelphia Pride Flag and the Progress Pride Flag were met with some controversy and backlash for these reasons, but also praise and widespread adoption.

Quasar's iteration of the Progress Pride flag is licensed under a Creative Commons license, which excludes commercial use. This has been criticized for not aligning with Baker's original intent for the flag's first iteration. Quasar has openly stated that small organizations can use the flag commercially, and the license was chosen to impose restrictions on large corporations. Quasar stated: "A changing point for me was when I started to see it getting used in a way that I didn’t personally agree with. Companies were snatching it up, making stuff out of it, and selling it without my attribution attached. It was purely rainbow capitalism based marketing…If you’re going to make money off of something that I created within my community it’s only fair that you give back not just to me as the artist, but the community itself, too." Criticism of the flag has also come from LGBTQ people of color, who felt that the flag, despite its inclusive intent, was created without consultation with the community.

== Gallery ==
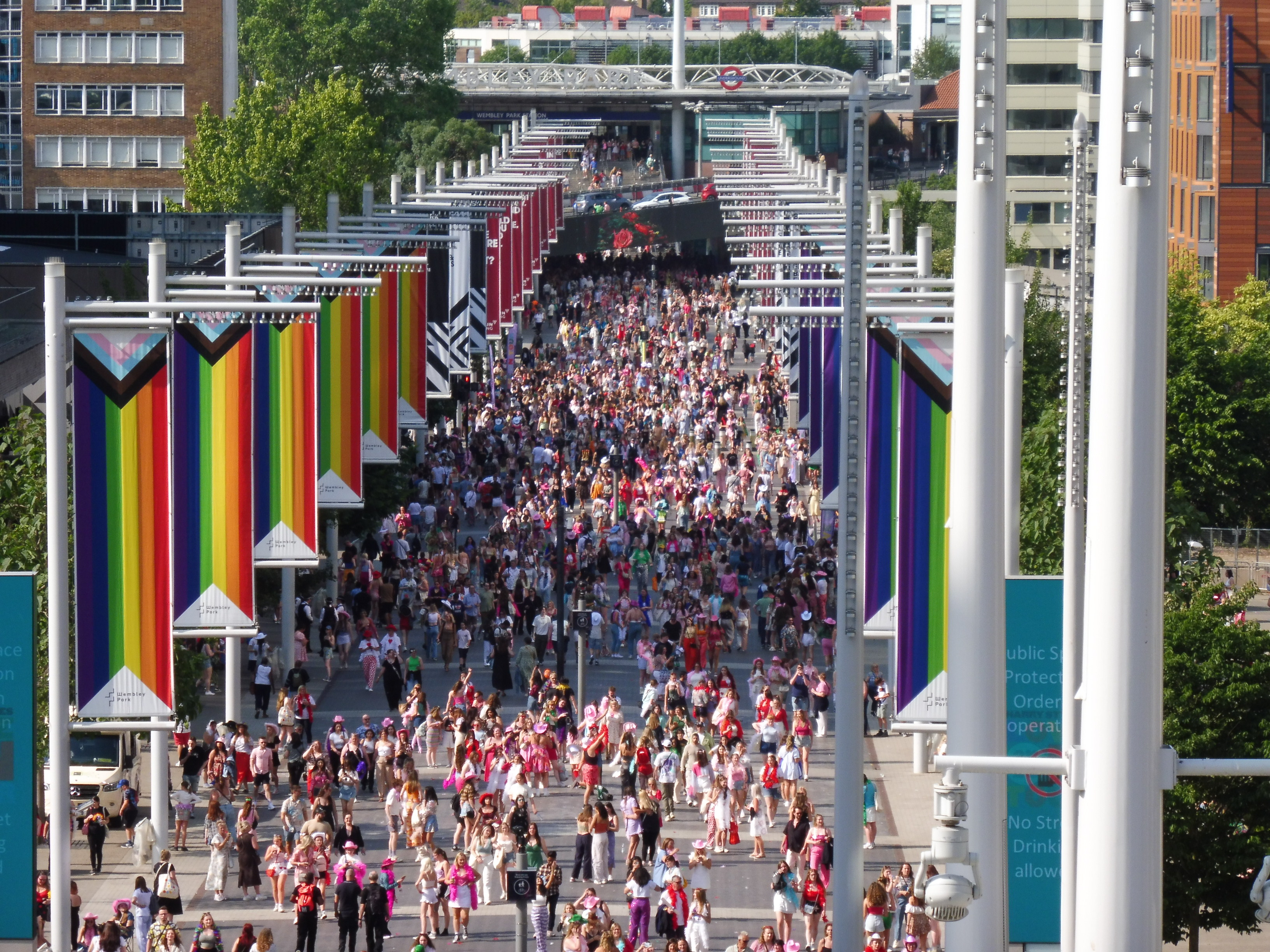
Progress pride flags lining the Olympic way at Wembley Stadium in London. People are arriving at the stadium for a Harry Styles concert. 2023

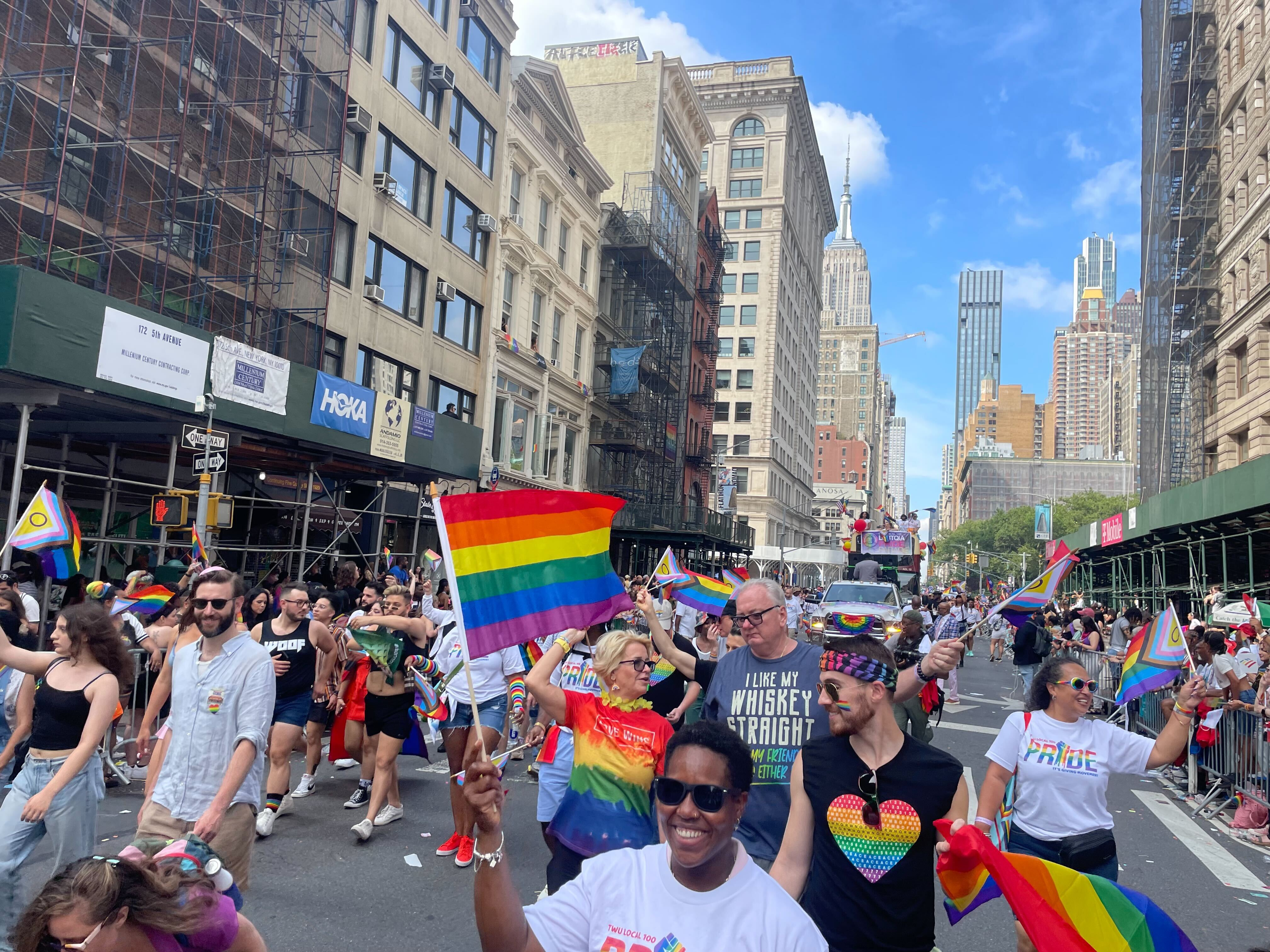
Intersex-inclusive Progress Pride flags at a pride march in New York. 2023

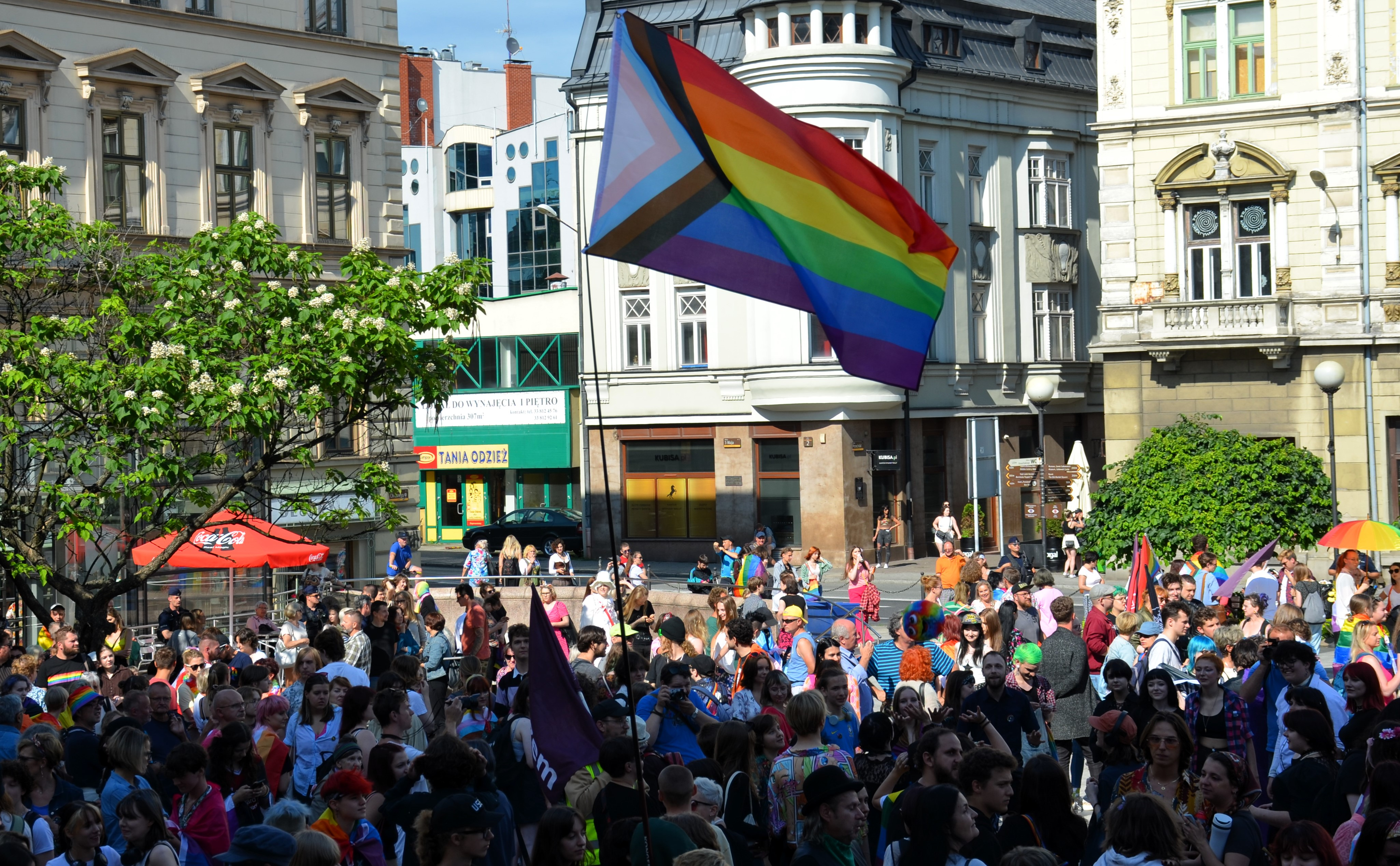
Progress Pride flags at a pride march in Bielsko-Biała, Poland. 2023

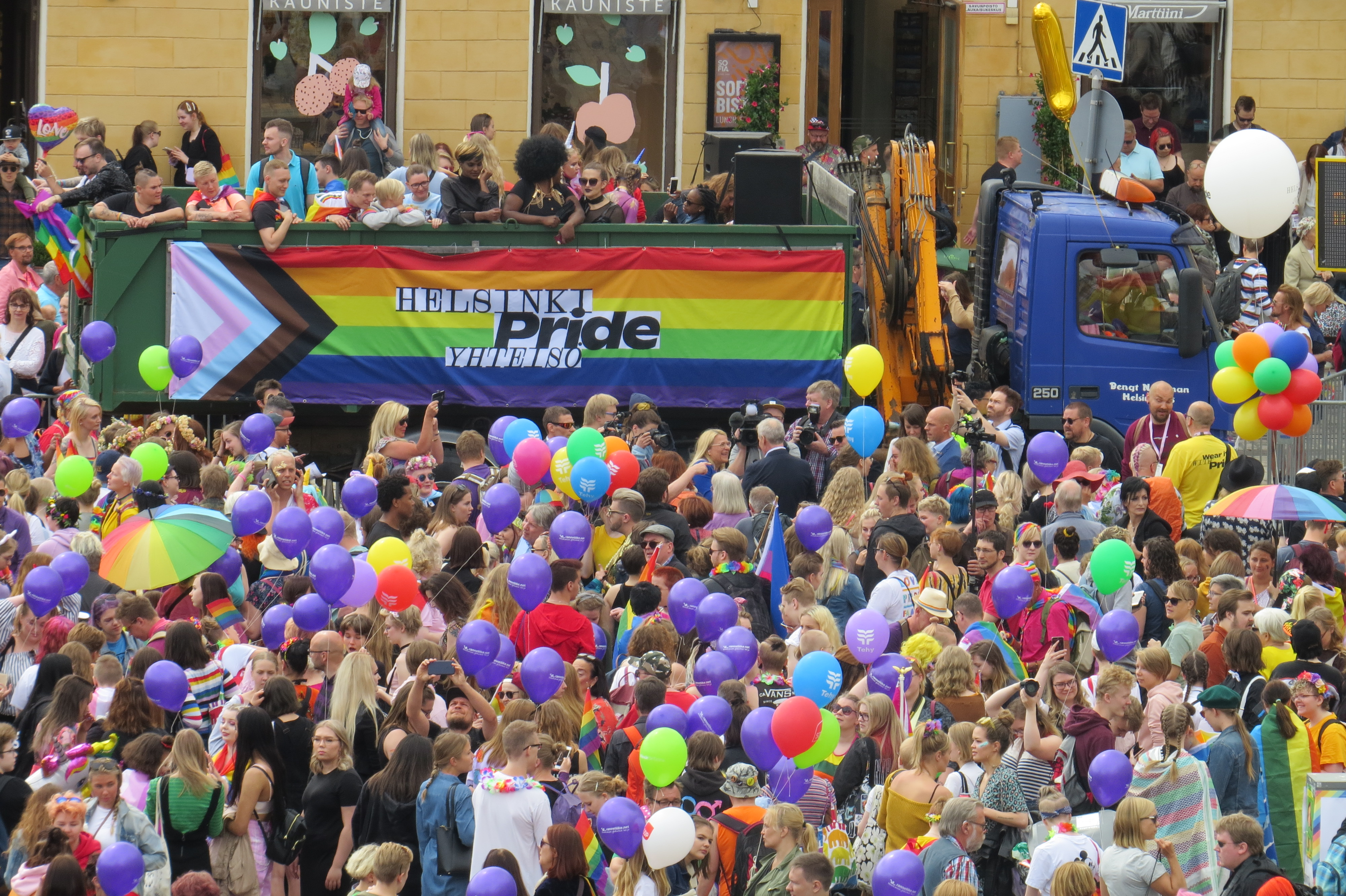
Helsinki Pride 2019.

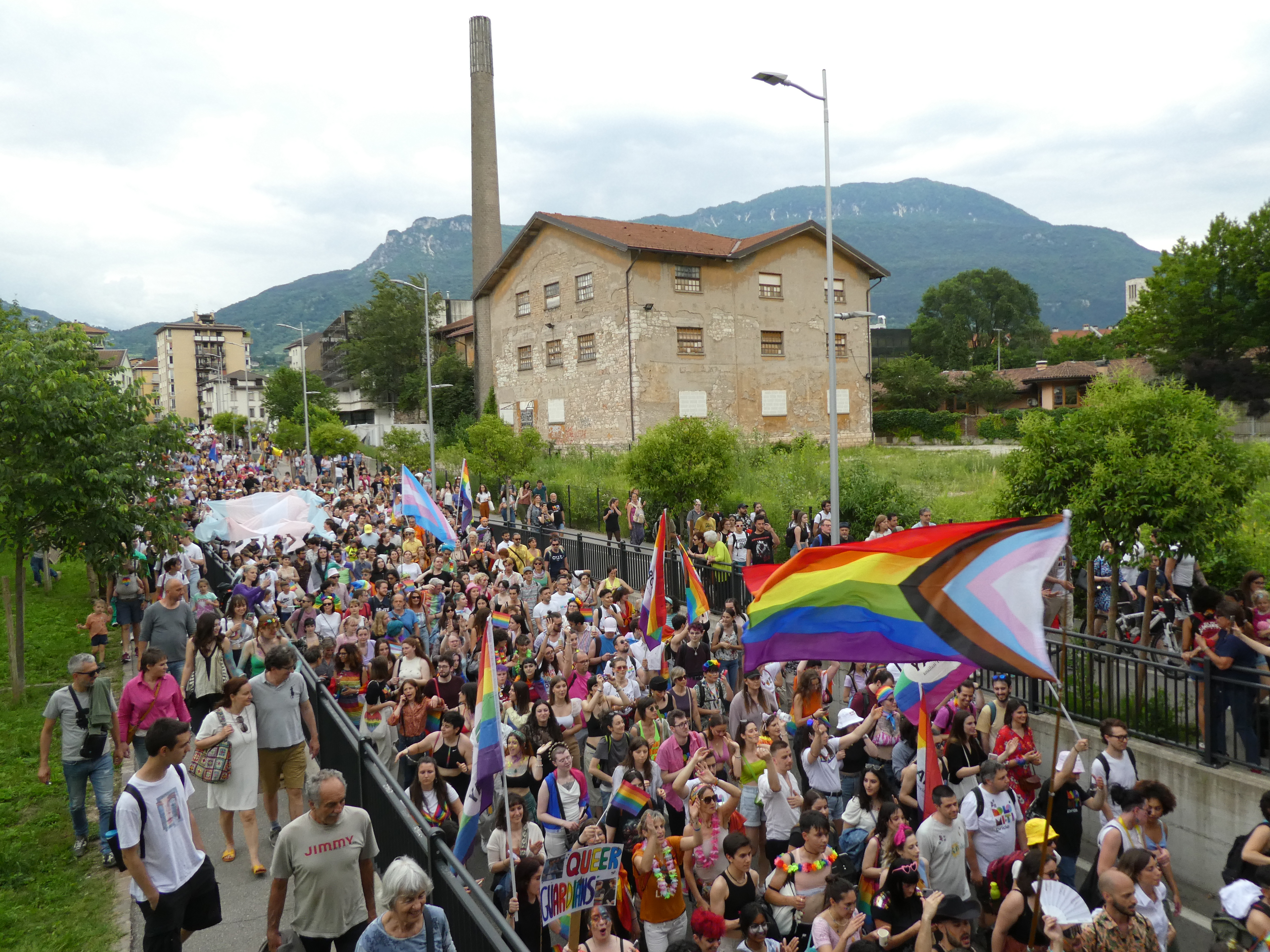
Dolomiti Pride in Trento Italy. 2023

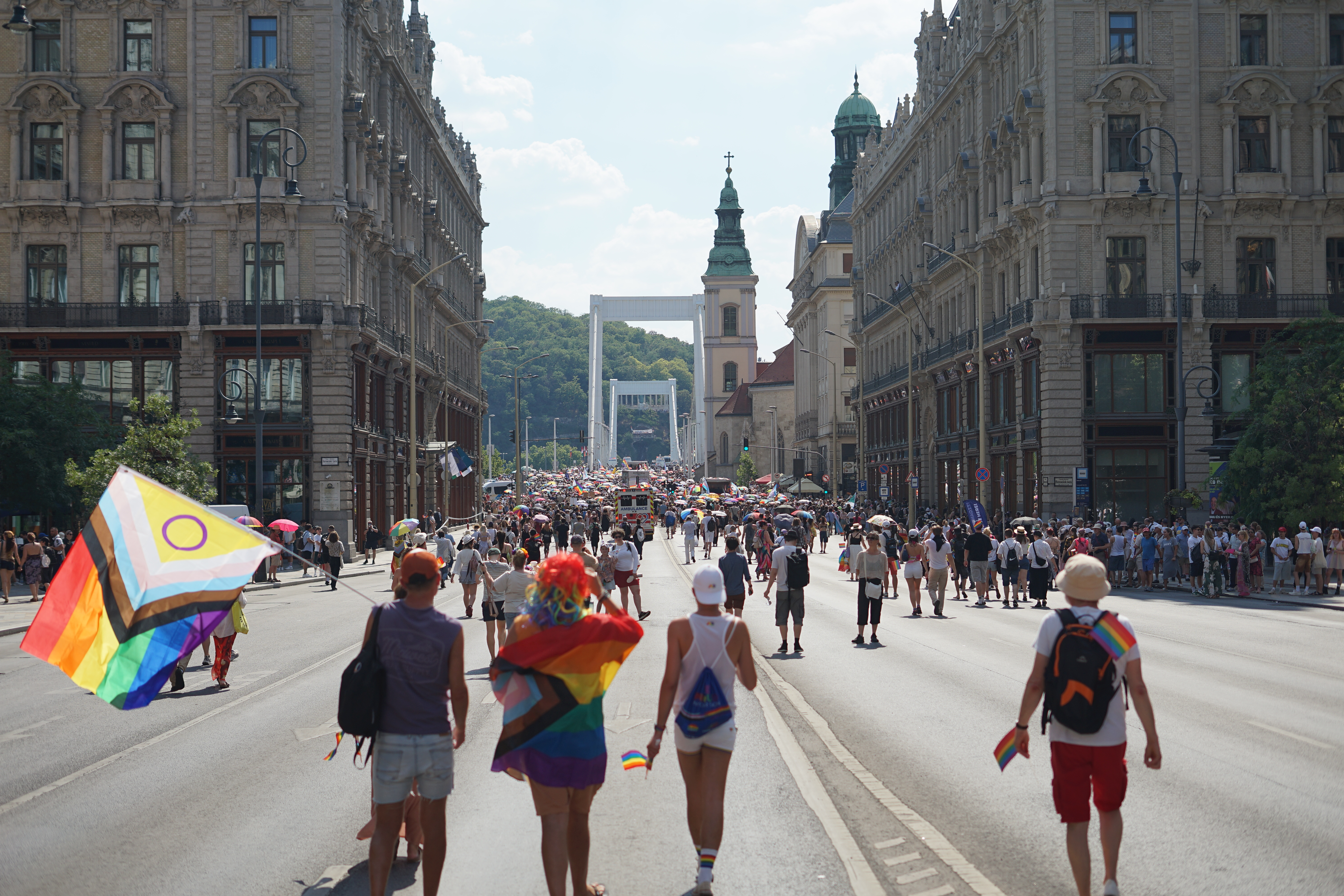
Intersex-inclusive Progress Pride flags at Budapest Pride 2026.

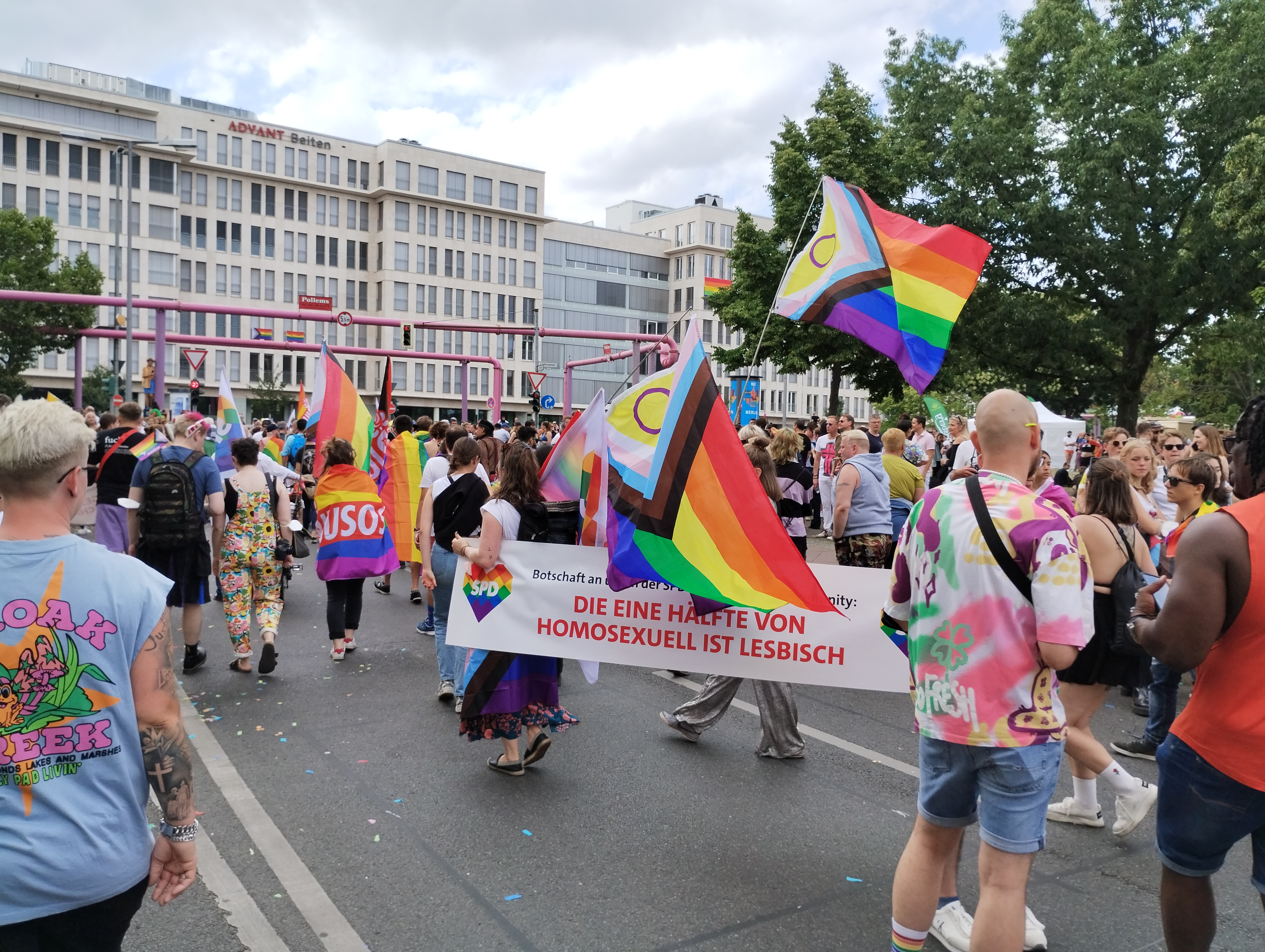
Christopher Street Day parade in Berlin 2022.

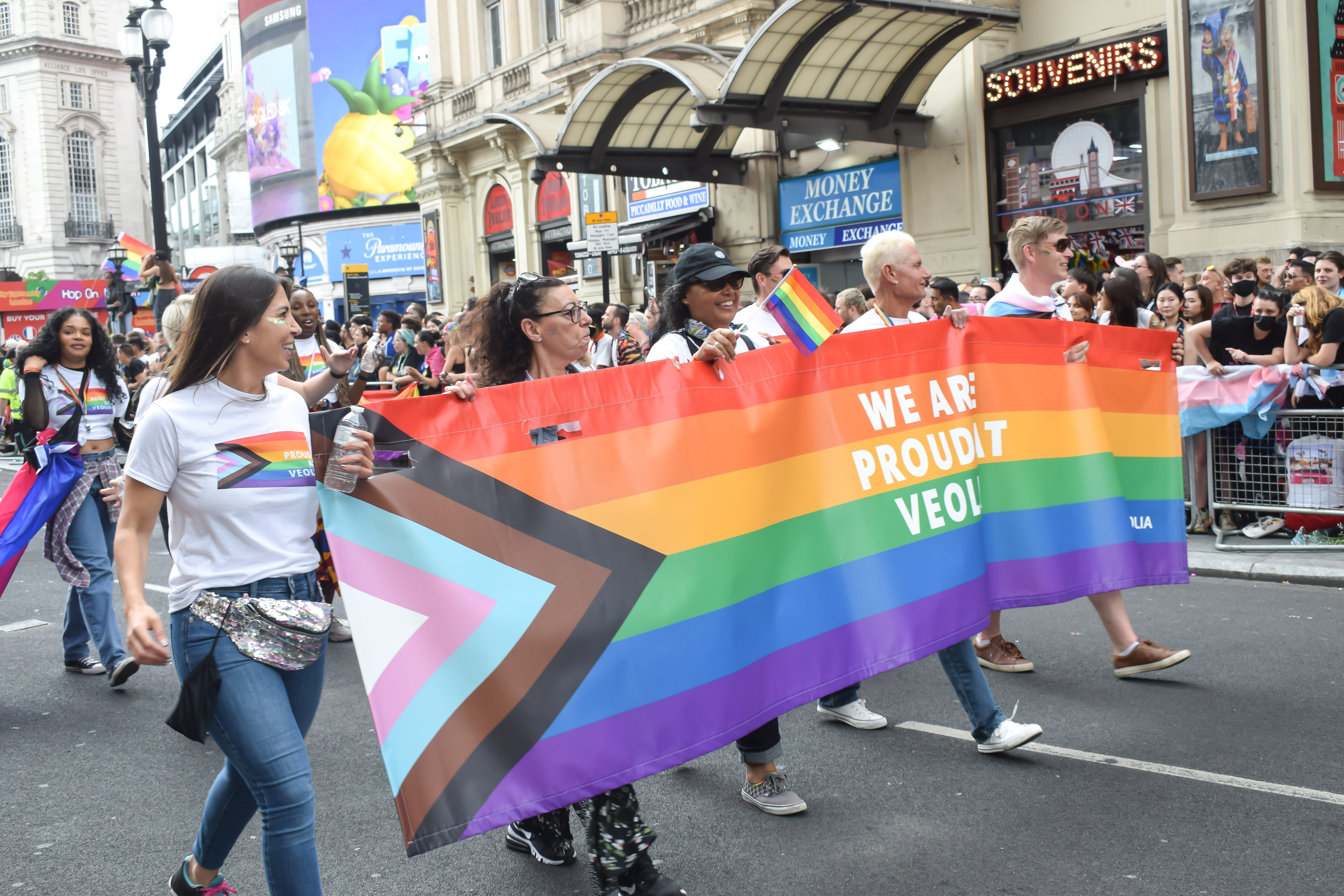
London Pride parade 2022.

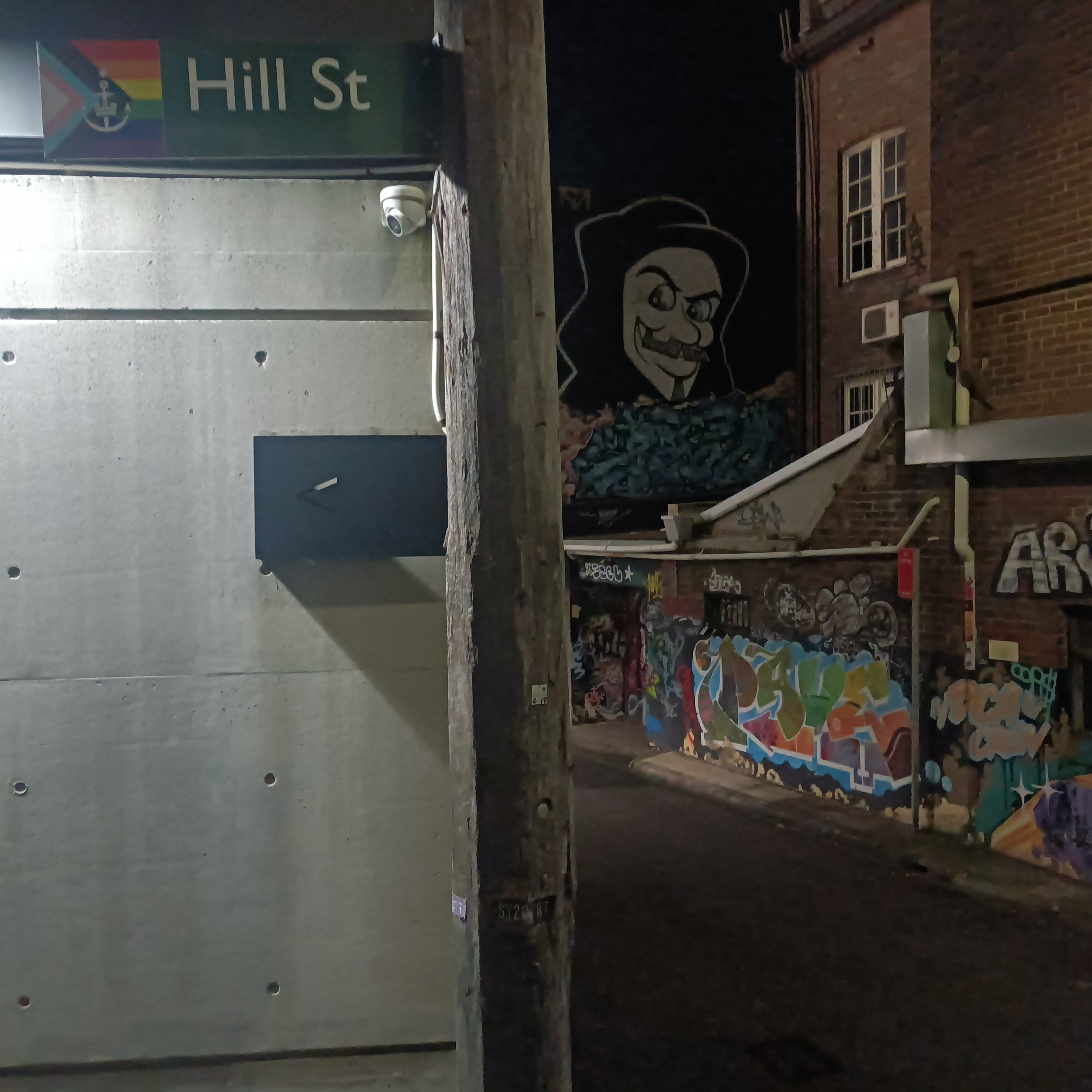
A street sign in Surry Hills, Sydney, showing the Progress Pride flag. 2026

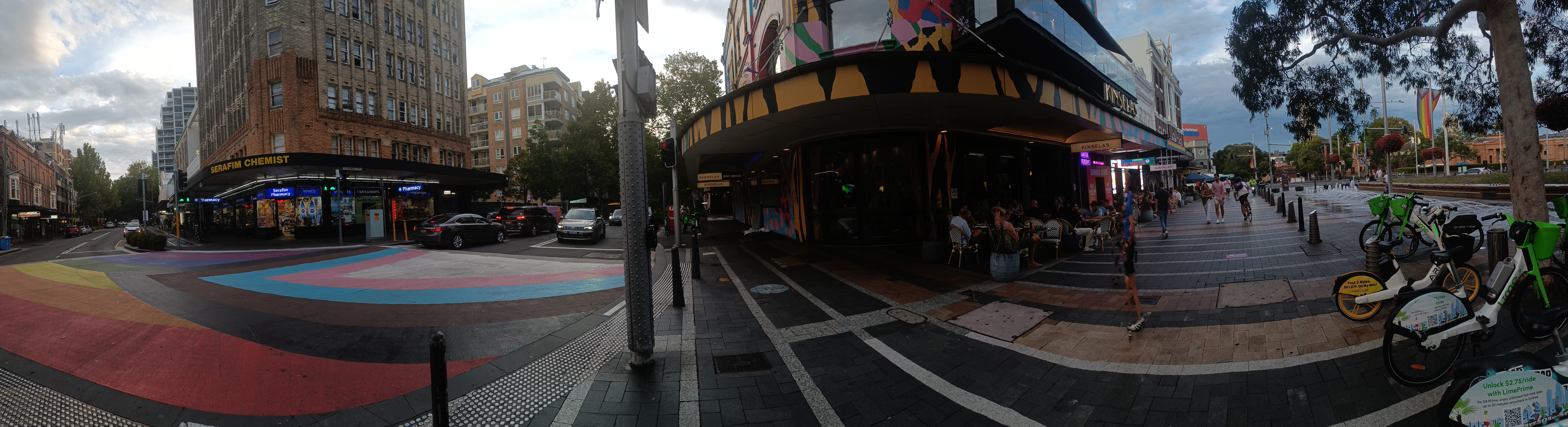
A rainbow crossing in Taylor Square, Darlinghurst, Sydney that was updated in 2024 to include the Progress Pride flag.

== See also ==
- Racism in the LGBTQ community
- Disability flag
