= Intersex flag =

Flag used by the intersex community

- Use: Symbol of the intersex community
- Proportion: 2:3
- Adopted: 2013
- Design: Open purple circle lying on a yellow field
- Designed by: Morgan Carpenter

Early intersex flag from year 2010

The intersex flag, also called the intersex pride flag, is a flag representing intersex individuals and the intersex community. It was created by Morgan Carpenter of Intersex Human Rights Australia in 2013.

== History and design ==
The flag was created in July 2013 by Morgan Carpenter of Intersex Human Rights Australia (then known as Organisation Intersex International Australia) to create a flag "that is not derivative, but is yet firmly grounded in meaning". Yellow and purple were chosen as colours as they were viewed as free from gender associations and were historically used to represent intersex people. The circle is described as "unbroken and unornamented, symbolizing wholeness and completeness, and our potentialities."

The organization describes it as freely available "for use by any intersex person or organization who wishes to use it, in a human rights affirming community context".

== Usage ==
The intersex flag has been utilised by a range of media and human rights organisations. In June 2018, intersex activists took part in Utrecht Canal Pride, waving the flag.

In May 2018, New Zealand became the first country where the intersex flag was raised outside the national parliament.

== Gallery ==
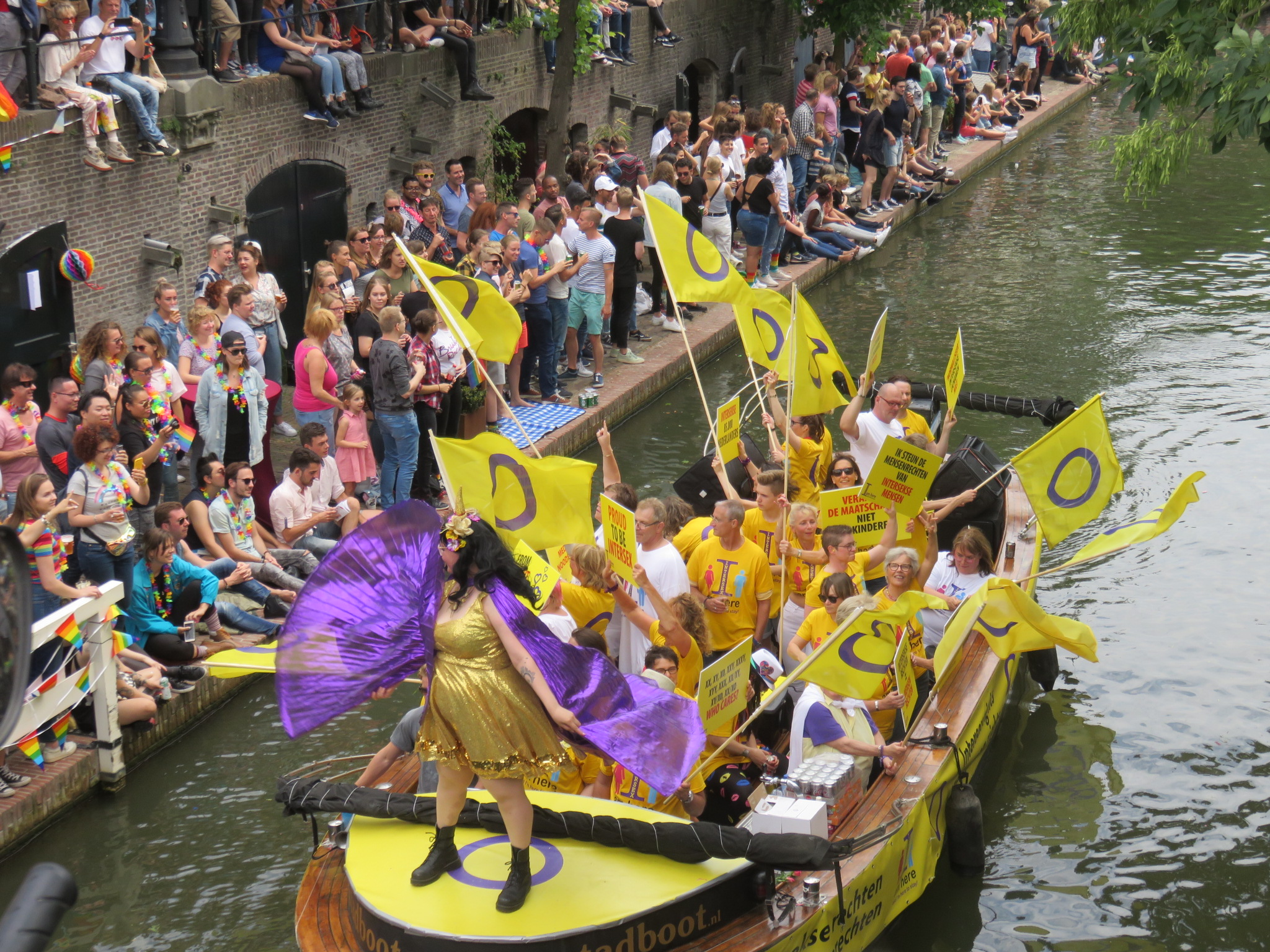
Intersex activists on a boat at Utrecht Canal Pride in the Netherlands, on June 16, 2018

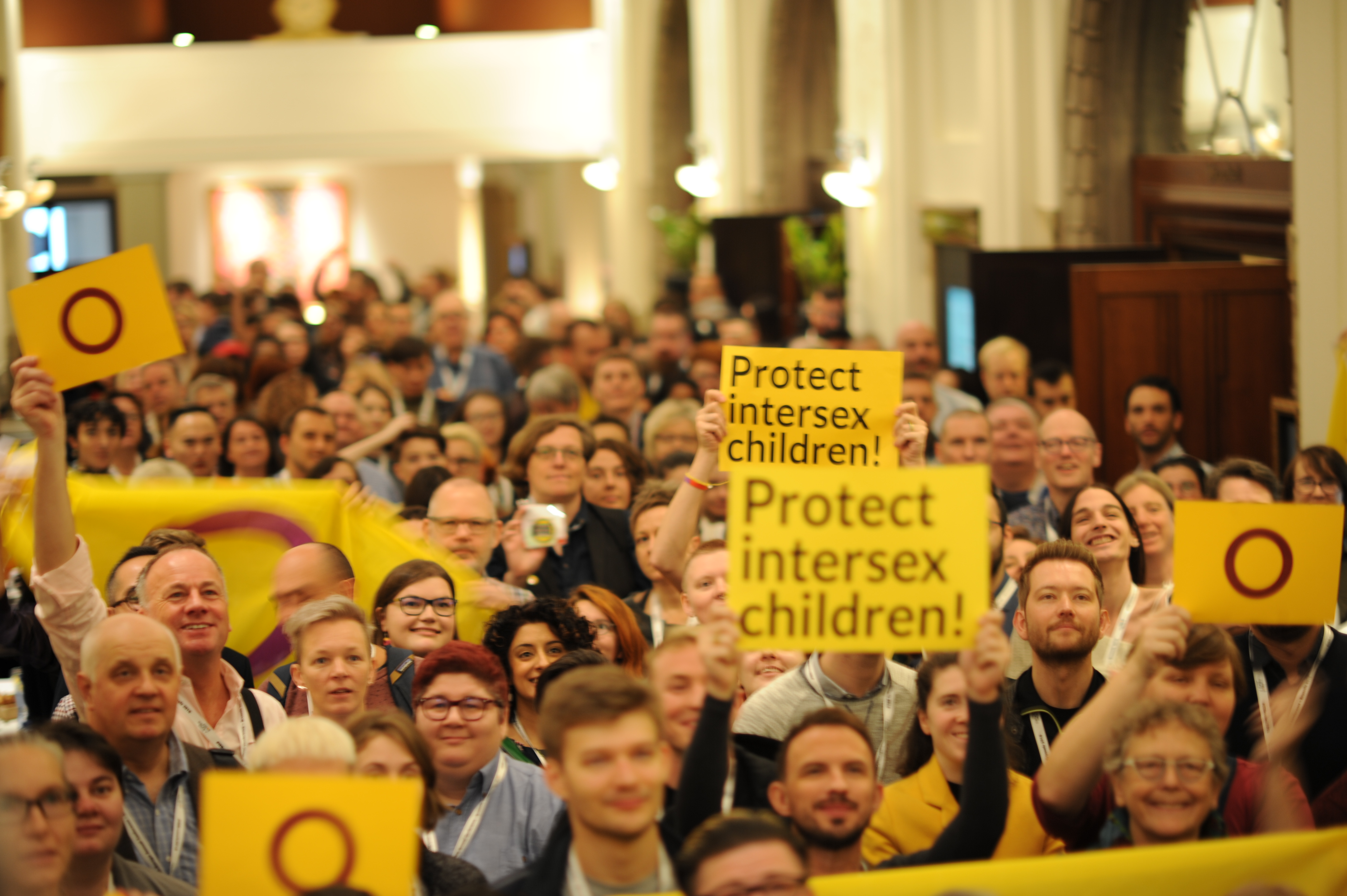
ILGA-Europe conference 2018 participants on Intersex Awareness Day, 2018

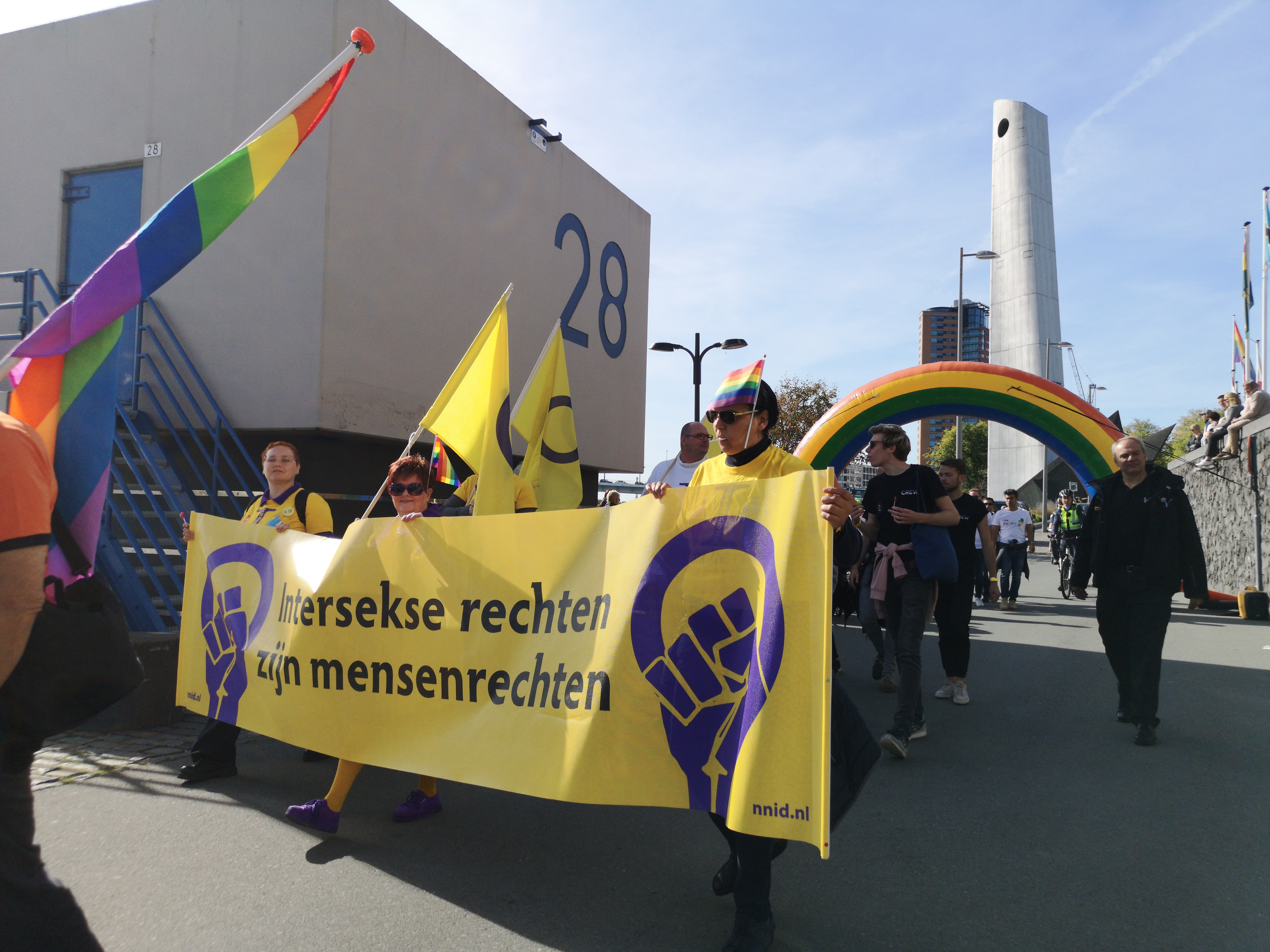
Rotterdam Pride, Netherlands, 2018

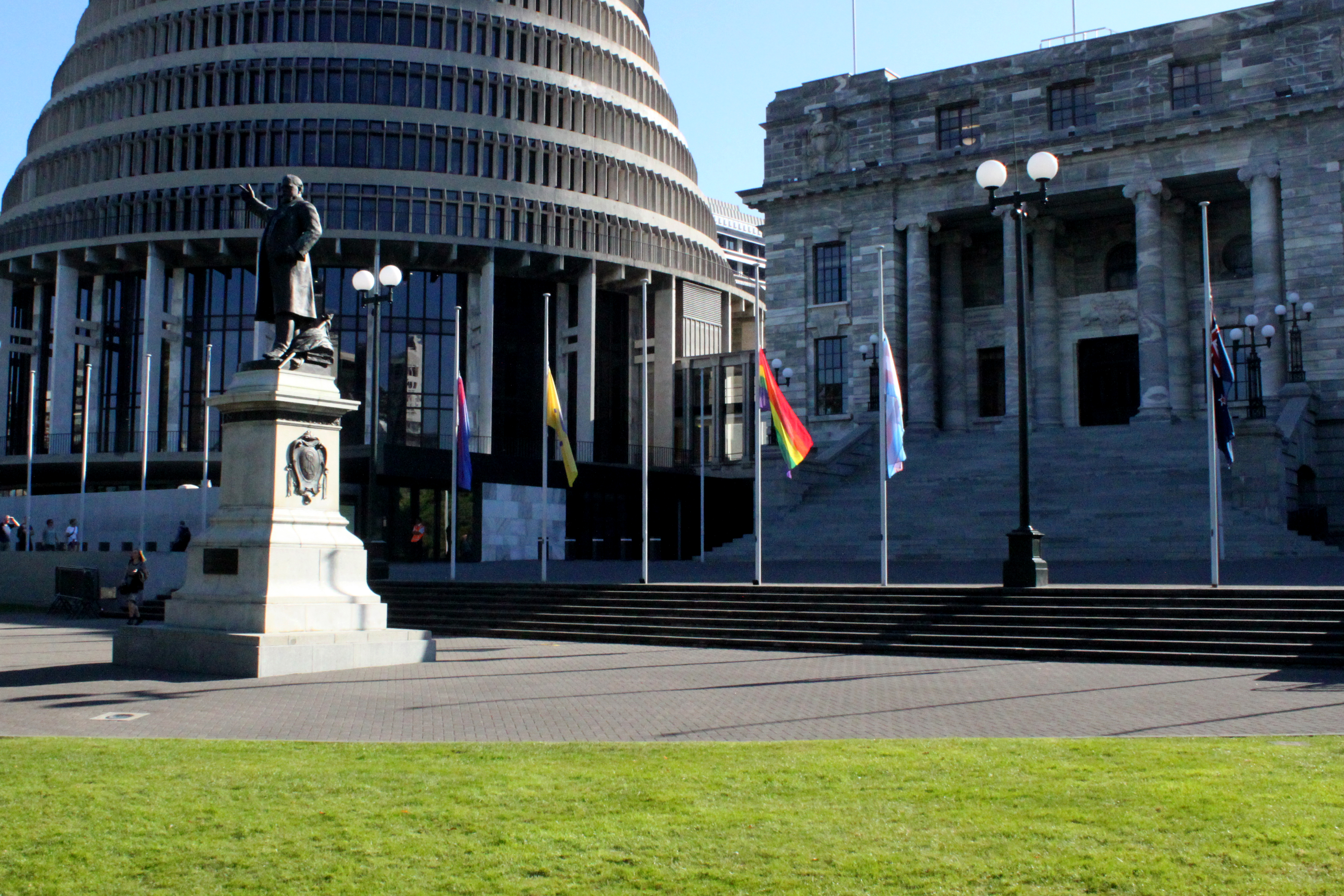
Outside the New Zealand Parliament Buildings, 18 March 2019, flown at half-staff in memory of those killed in the Christchurch mosque shootings on 15 March 2019.

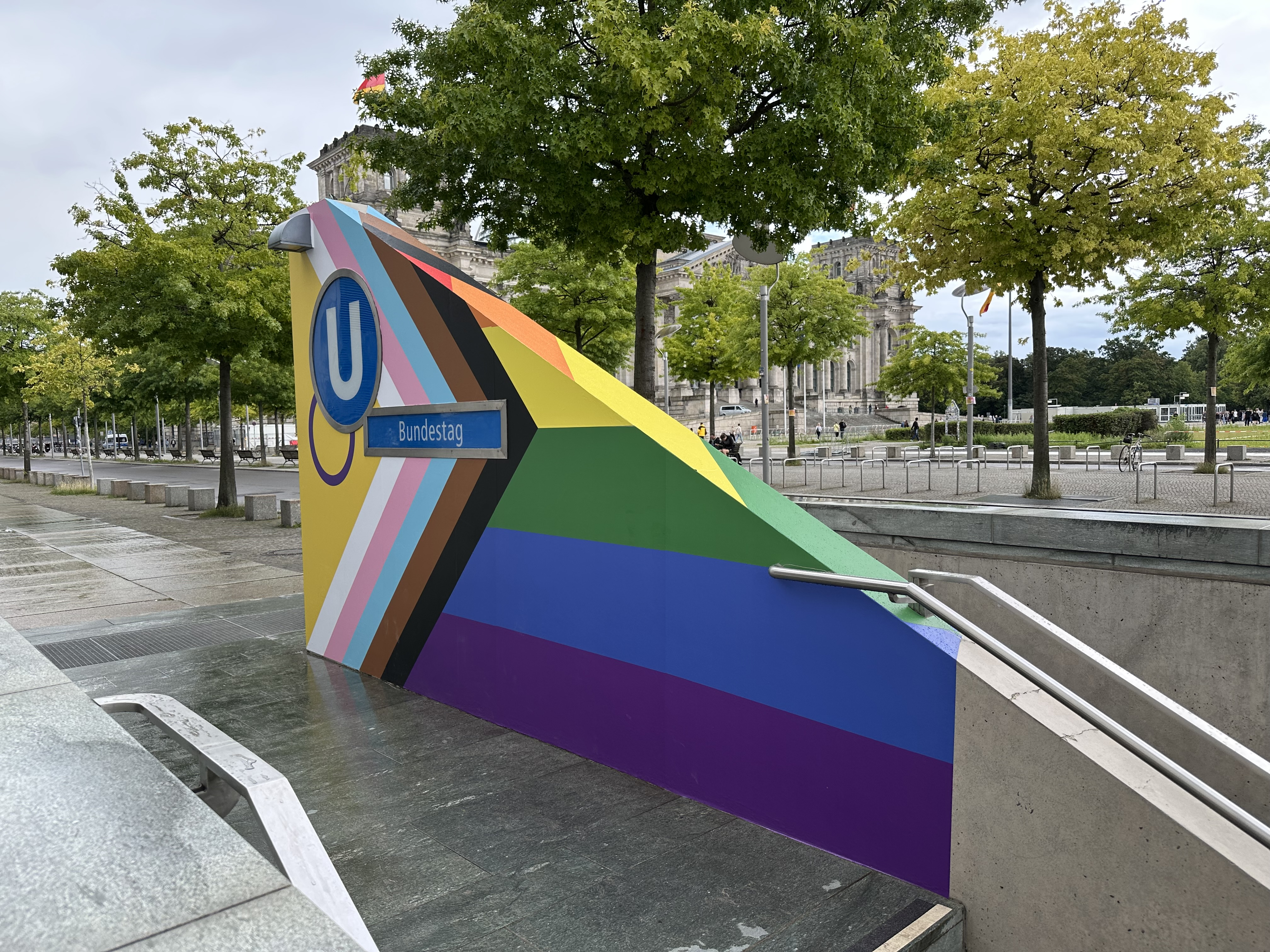
Bundestag train station, Berlin, 2025

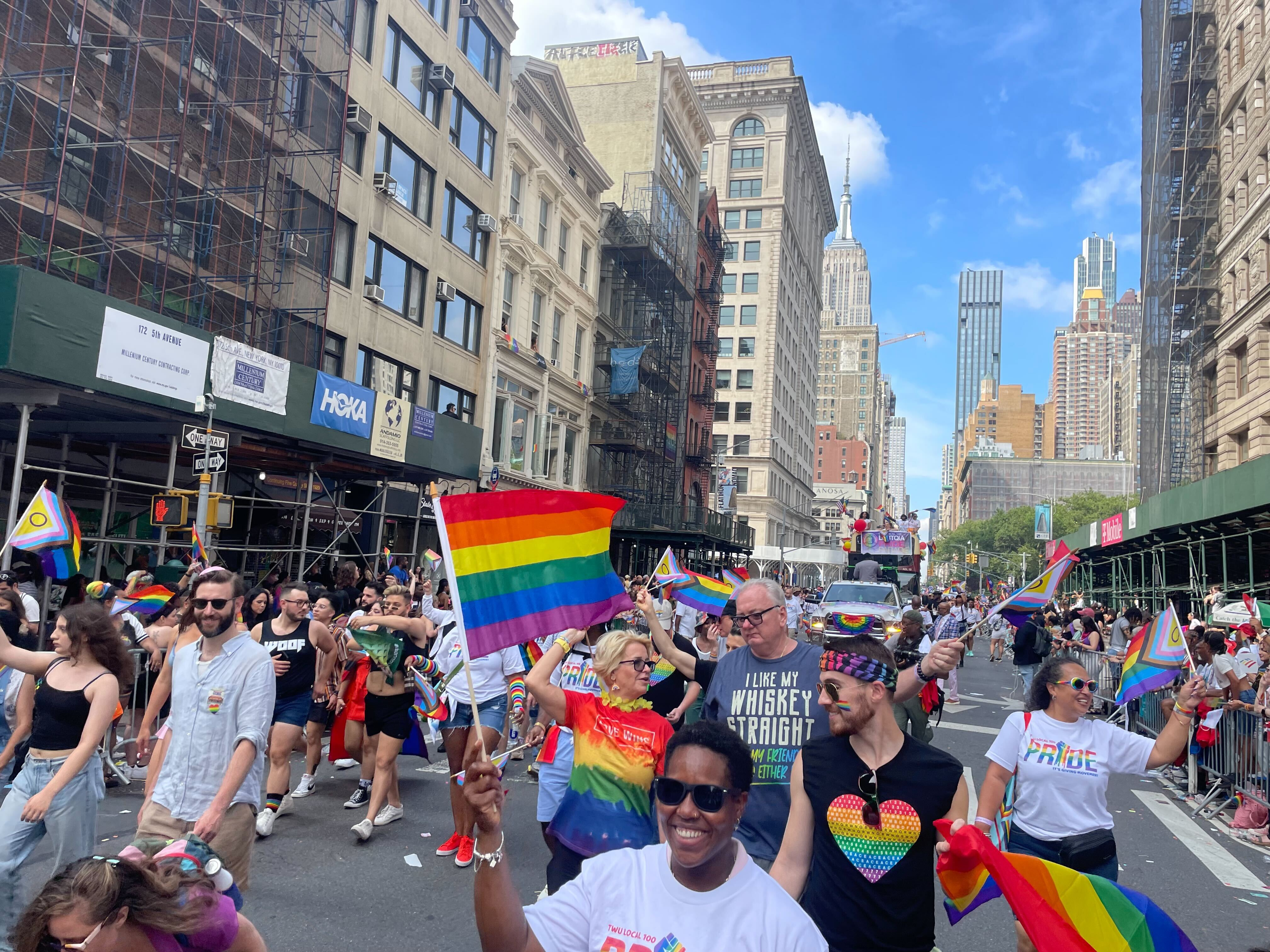
Intersex-inclusive Progress Pride flags at a Pride March in New York. 2023

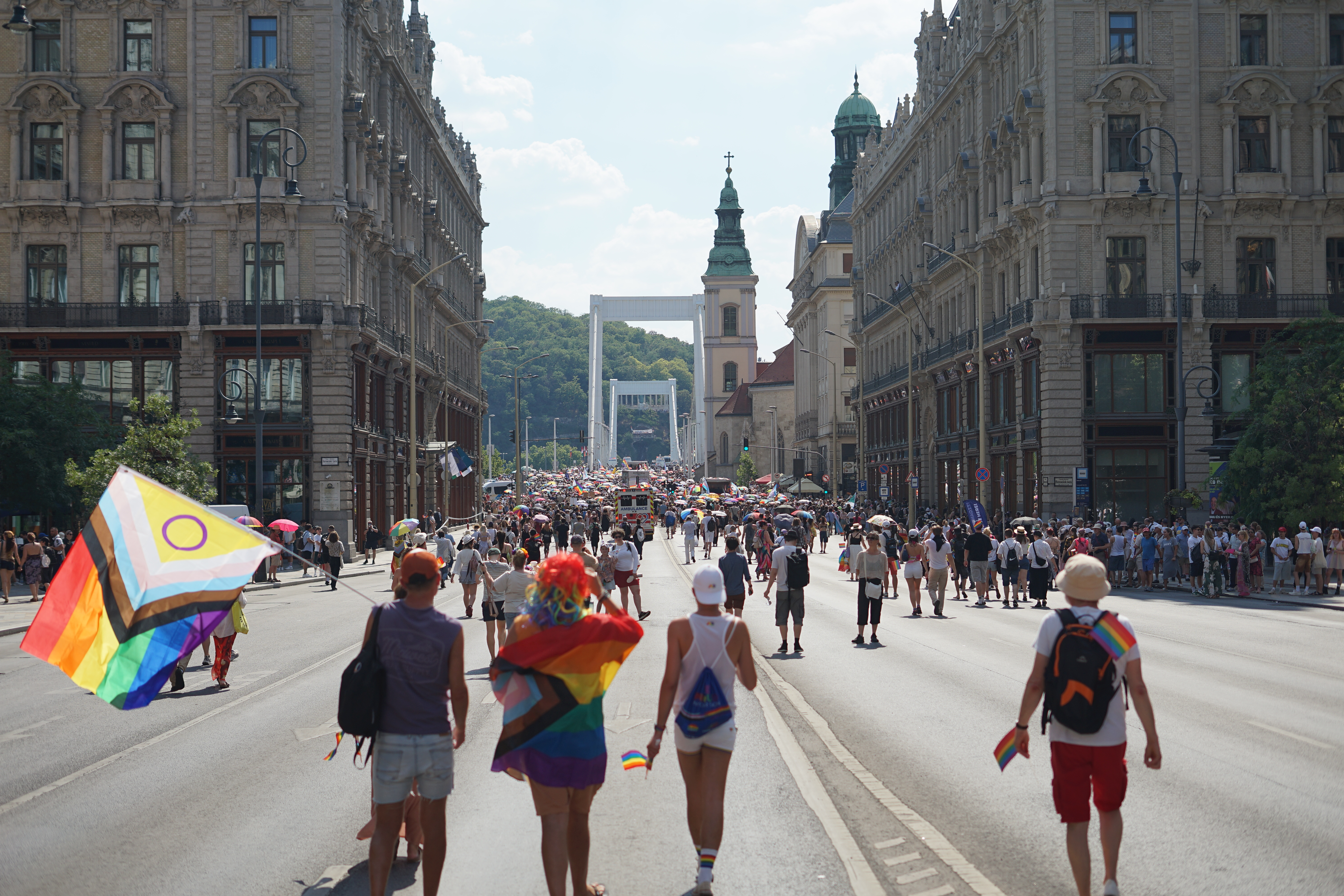
Intersex-inclusive Progress Pride flags at Budapest Pride 2026.

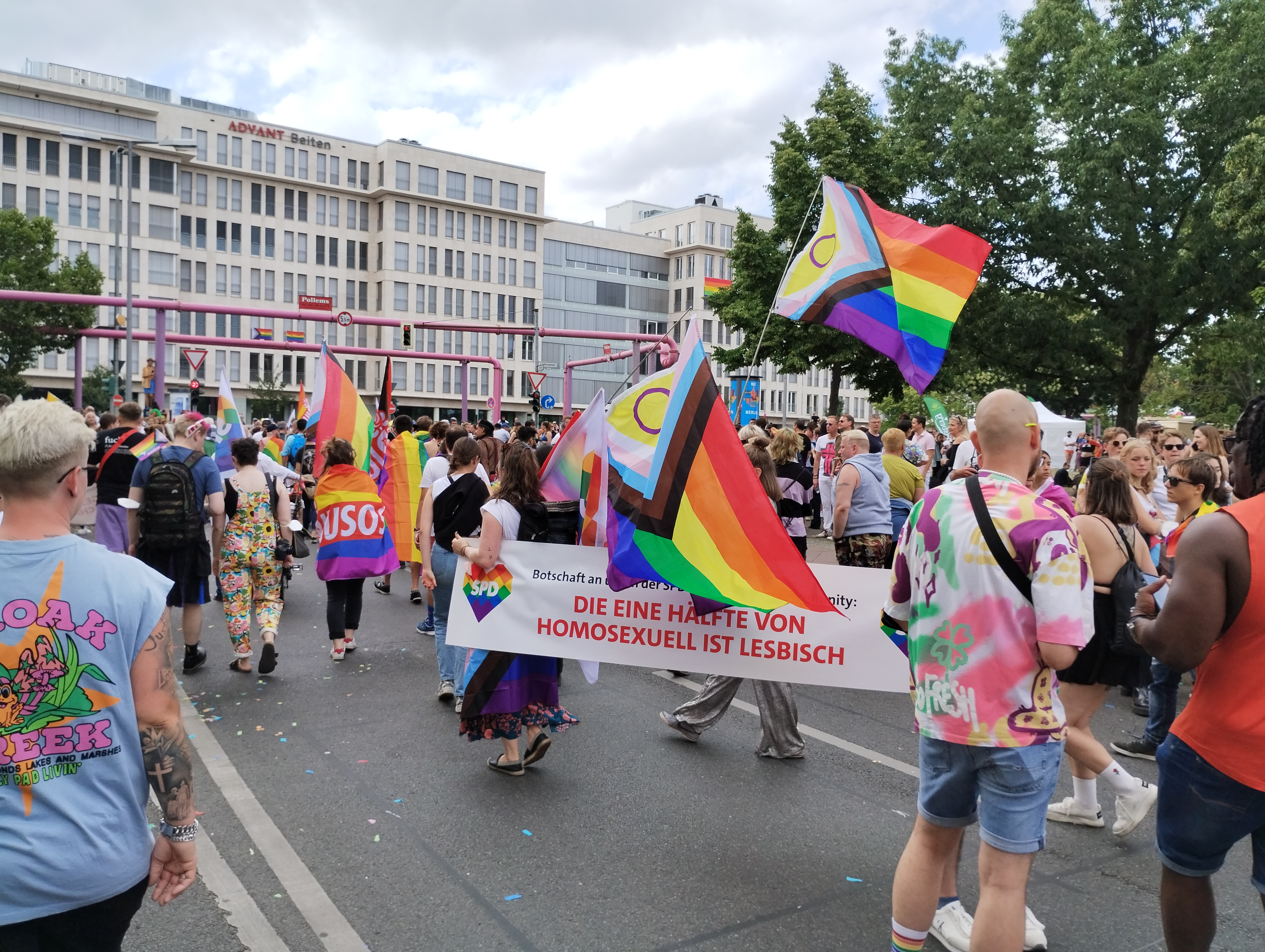
Christopher Street Day parade in Berlin 2022.

== Flags derived from the intersex flag ==
The intersex flag has been remixed and adapted in numerous ways. For example, in 2021, the intersex flag was incorporated into the Progress Pride flag version of the rainbow pride flag by Valentino Vecchietti of Intersex Equality Rights UK.

The Progress Pride flag with the intersex flag (2021)

== Other intersex symbols ==
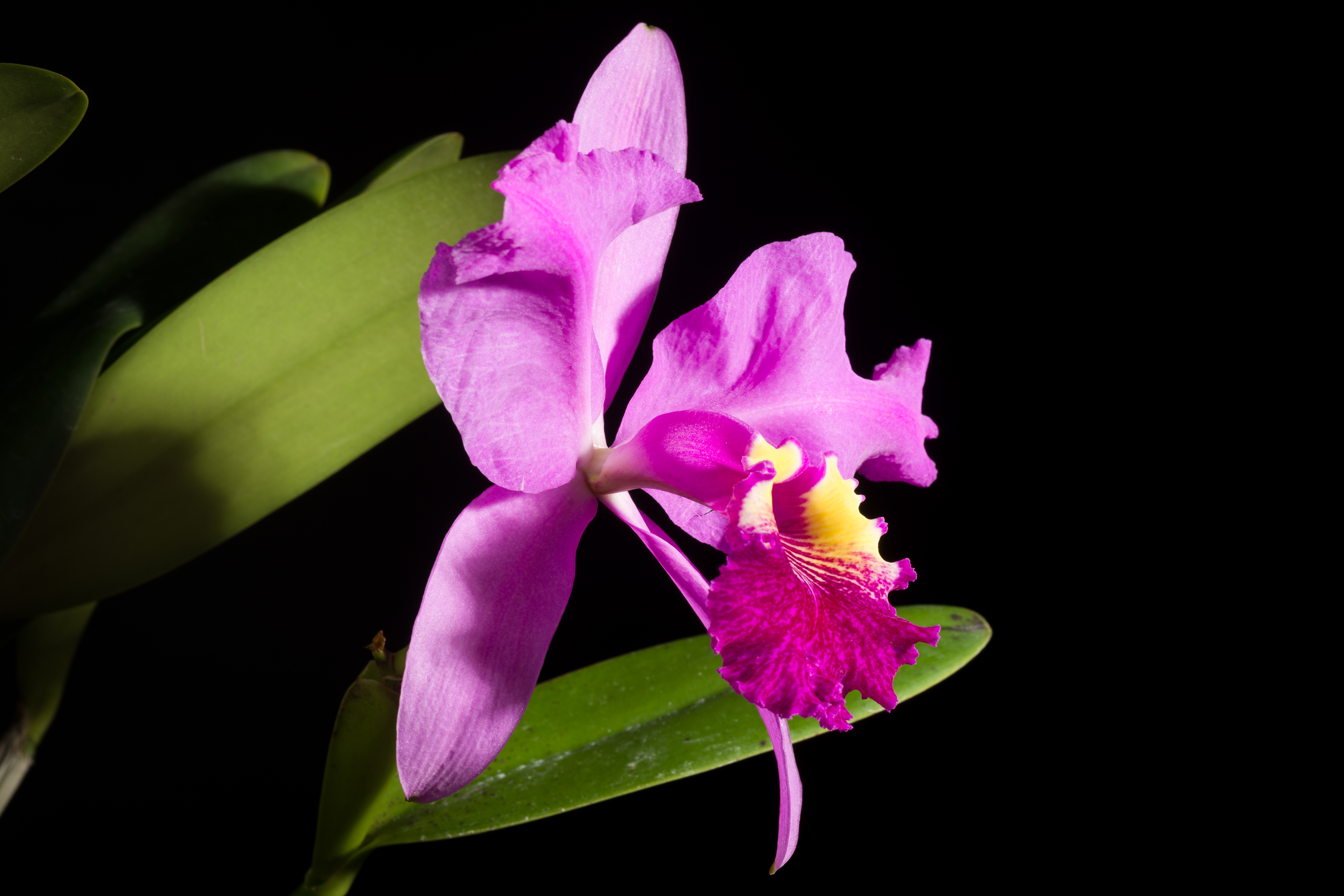
An orchid flower

Because the word "orchid" comes from the Greek word for testicle, and the orchiectomy is a common surgery performed on intersex infants –especially those with androgen insensitivity syndrome– the orchid flower is symbolic of intersexuality and of opposition to non-consensual genital surgery.

== See also ==
- Intersex
- Intersex human rights
