= PFLAG (disambiguation) =

PFLAG (Parents, Families and Friends of Lesbians and Gays) is an American LGBTQ organization.

PFLAG may also refer to:

- PFLAG Canada
- PFLAG China

== See also ==
- Families and Friends of Lesbians and Gays
