= Daniel Quasar =

American graphic designer and vexillographer

- Occupations: Artist; graphic designer; musician
- Known for: Designer of the Progress Pride flag
- Website: danielquasar.com

Daniel Quasar is an American artist and graphic designer, known for their (Note: Quasar is non-binary and uses xe/xem or they/them pronouns. This article uses they/them for consistency.) design of the Progress Pride flag, a variation of the rainbow pride flag that incorporates additional colors to explicitly represent trans people and LGBTQ+ people of color.

== Education and career ==
Quasar graduated with a BFA in Communication Design from Pacific Northwest College of Art. During the degree program, they were involved in the local drag community; their design career has since included animations and graphics for RuPaul's Drag Race world tours, as well as work with Drag Race winner Jinkx Monsoon.

Quasar's "Progress" variant of the LGBTQ+ rainbow flag

== Progress Pride flag ==
In 2018, Quasar re-designed the existing rainbow flag to incorporate the transgender flag, as well as black and brown stripes to represent LGBTQ+ people of color, with the black stripe having an additional meaning for "those living with AIDS, those no longer living, and the stigma surrounding them". The additional colors were added in a chevron shape along the hoist to represent forward movement. They began a crowdfunding campaign to fund the first production of the flags. In 2021, Deliveroo adopted the progress pride flag for Pride Month. The flag has been flown in many international cities above official buildings, including New York City, London, Boston, and Sydney.

== Personal life ==
As of 2021, Quasar resided in Portland, Oregon.
