= Morgan Carpenter =

Bioethicist and intersex activist

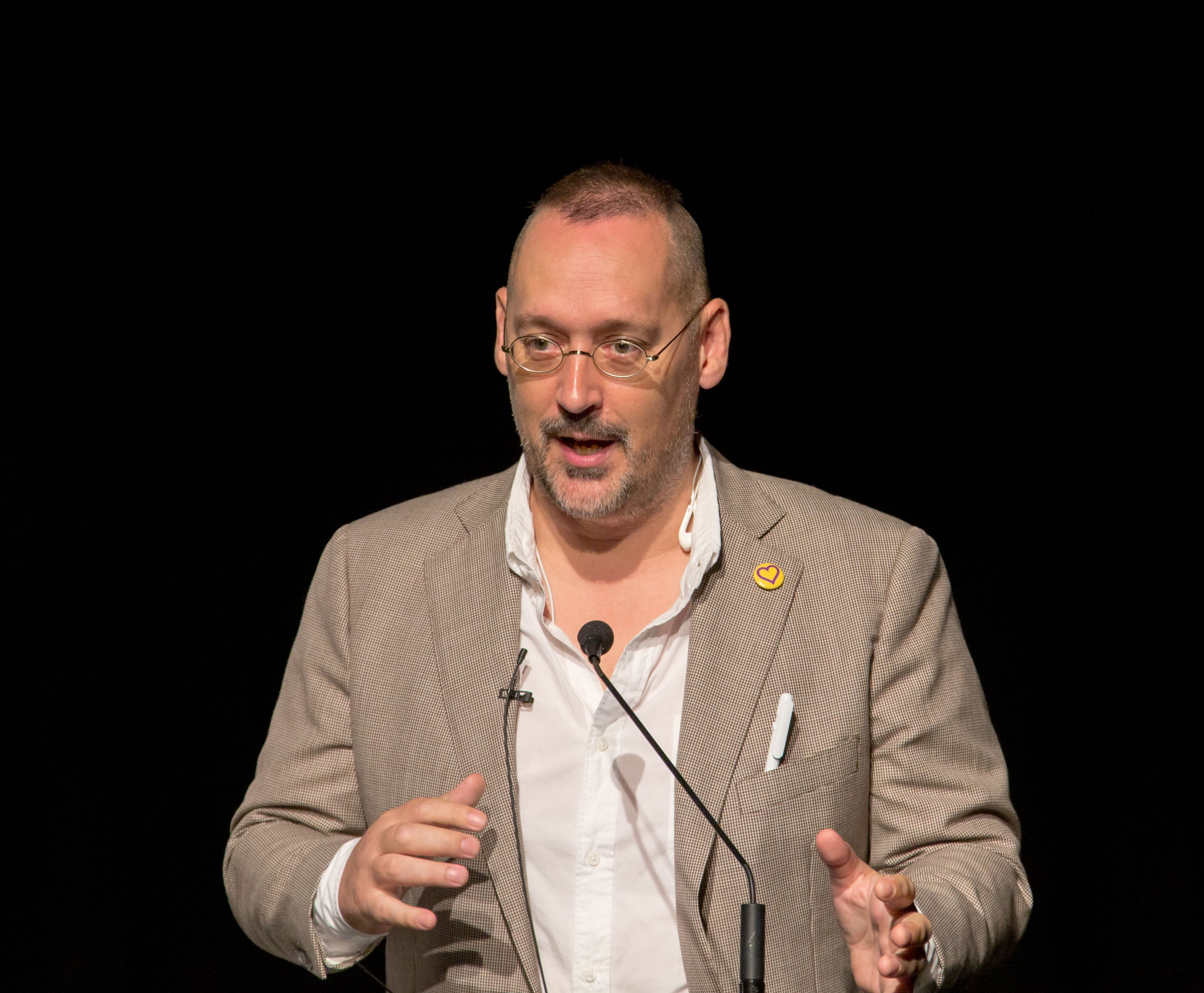
- Born: 1966 (age 59–60)
- Education: University of Sydney
- Known for: Bioethicist, intersex flag, executive director of InterAction for Health and Human Rights
- Website: morgancarpenter.com

Morgan Carpenter is a bioethicist, intersex activist and researcher. In 2013, he created an intersex flag, and became president of Intersex Human Rights Australia, now InterAction for Health and Human Rights. He is now executive director. Following enactment of legislative protections for people with innate variations of sex characteristics in the Australian Capital Territory, Carpenter is a member of the Variations in Sex Characteristics Restricted Medical Treatment Assessment Board.

== Background ==
Carpenter holds a doctorate in bioethics from the University of Sydney and also holds qualifications from the University of Technology, Sydney, Dublin City University and Coventry University. His intersex status was diagnosed as an adult, with a surgical history.

== Activism ==
Morgan Carpenter helped found Intersex Human Rights Australia and became president of the organisation in September 2013. Carpenter wrote the organization's submissions to Senate inquiries, appearing before a Senate hearing on anti-discrimination legislation during activities that led to the adoption of an "intersex status" attribute in anti-discrimination law on 1 August 2013, and a Senate committee inquiry on the involuntary or coerced sterilisation of people with disabilities and intersex people.

Carpenter contributes to work on reform of international medical classifications and medical practices within Australia. He is named as a reviewer for a DSD Genetics website funded by the National Health and Medical Research Council, Australia, and has also authored critiques of eugenic selection against intersex traits, and clinical research priorities. He speaks out against stigma, and has spoken out on issues affecting women purported to have intersex traits in competitive sport.

Carpenter took part in the first United Nations expert meeting on ending human rights violations against intersex people in 2015. In the same year, he re-established a central awareness raising site for Intersex Awareness Day with Laura Inter of Brújula Intersexual, and support from Open Society Foundations. Carpenter was also a drafting committee member and signatory of the 2017 Yogyakarta Principles plus 10, on the application of international human rights law in relation to sexual orientation, gender identity, gender expression and sex characteristics.

Carpenter has been published by The Guardian, SBS, Australian Broadcasting Corporation, and other media.

Intersex flag

=== Intersex flag ===
An Intersex flag was created in July 2013 by Carpenter as a flag "that is not derivative, but is yet firmly grounded in meaning". Describing the flag for Intersex Human Rights Australia, Carpenter wrote:

The circle is unbroken and unornamented, symbolising wholeness and completeness, and our potentialities. We are still fighting for bodily autonomy and genital integrity, and this symbolises the right to be who and how we want to be.

— Morgan Carpenter

== Academic work ==
With recognition of non-binary gender identities in Australian regulations, and German birth certificates, Carpenter expressed concern that such developments are "not a solution" to the needs of intersex people. In 2018, he wrote that:

In practice, intersex bodies remain "normalized" or eliminated by medicine, while society and the law "others" intersex identities. That is, medicine constructs intersex bodies as either female or male, while law and society construct intersex identities as neither female nor male.

Carpenter argues that claims that medicalization "saves intersex people" from being framed as the "other", while "legal othering saves intersex people from medicalization are contradictory and empty rhetoric".

In an article on the Yogyakarta Principles and relationships between intersex and LGBT populations, Carpenter stresses inadequacies and "dangerous" consequences from framing intersex as a sexual orientation or gender identity issue, inviting legislative enactment of protections on grounds of sex characteristics.

== Selected bibliography ==
=== Books and book chapters ===
- Carpenter, Morgan (September 2018). "The 'normalisation' of intersex bodies and 'othering' of intersex identities". In Jens Scherpe; Anatol Dutta; Tobias Helms (eds.). The Legal Status of Intersex Persons. Cambridge, England: Intersentia. pp. 445–514.
- Cabral Grinspan, Mauro; Carpenter, Morgan (2018). "Gendering the Lens: Critical Reflections on Gender, Hospitality and Torture". Gender Perspectives on Torture: Law and Practice. Center for Human Rights & Humanitarian Law, Washington College of Law, American University. pp. 183–96.
- Jones, Tiffany; Hart, Bonnie; Carpenter, Morgan; Ansara, Gavi; Leonard, William; Lucke, Jayne (February 2016). Intersex: Stories and Statistics from Australia. Cambridge, UK: Open Book Publishers. ISBN 978-1-78374-208-0.
- Carpenter, Morgan; European Foundation for the Improvement of Living and Working Conditions; Nexus Research Co-operative (1998). The employment of people with disabilities in small and medium-sized enterprises (PDF). Dublin, Ireland: European Foundation for the Improvement of Living and Working Conditions. ISBN 978-92-828-2949-3.

=== Journal articles ===
- Carpenter, Morgan (1 September 2020). "Caster Semenya's life and achievements are cause for celebration, respect and inclusion; her exclusion is consequential". Journal of Medical Ethics. 46 (9): 593–594. doi:10.1136/medethics-2020-106506. ISSN 0306-6800. PMID 32792348. S2CID 221126098.
- Carpenter, Morgan (2020). "Intersex human rights, sexual orientation, gender identity, sex characteristics and the Yogyakarta principles plus 10". Culture, Health & Sexuality. 23 (4): 516–532. doi:10.1080/13691058.2020.1781262. ISSN 1369-1058. PMID 32679003. S2CID 220631036.
- Carpenter, Morgan (2020). "The OHCHR background note on human rights violations against intersex people". Sexual and Reproductive Health Matters. 28 (1): 1–4. doi:10.1080/26410397.2020.1731298. ISSN 2641-0397. PMC 7888051. PMID 32204689.
- Karkazis, Katrina; Carpenter, Morgan (2018). "Impossible "choices": The inherent harms of regulating women's testosterone in sport". Journal of Bioethical Inquiry. 15 (4): 579–587. doi:10.1007/s11673-018-9876-3. ISSN 1872-4353. PMID 30117064.
- Carpenter, Morgan (2018). "Intersex variations, human rights, and the International Classification of Diseases". Health and Human Rights. 20 (2): 205–214. ISSN 2150-4113. PMC 6293350. PMID 30568414.
- Carpenter, Morgan (2018). "The 'normalization' of intersex bodies and 'othering' of intersex identities in Australia". Journal of Bioethical Inquiry. 15 (4): 487–495. doi:10.1007/s11673-018-9855-8. ISSN 1872-4353. PMID 29736897.
- Carpenter, Morgan (May 2016). "The human rights of intersex people: addressing harmful practices and rhetoric of change". Reproductive Health Matters. 24 (47): 74–84. doi:10.1016/j.rhm.2016.06.003. ISSN 0968-8080. PMID 27578341.

== Recognition ==
In a speech introducing legal protections for intersex people in medical settings in the Australian Capital Territory, Chief Minister Andrew Barr recognized Carpenter for his "tireless work".

In 2013, Australia's Gay News Network included Carpenter in their "LGBTI people to watch in 2014".
