= Valentino Vecchietti =

British intersex rights activist

- Occupations: Intersex equality campaigner, artist, writer, independent researcher, diversity speaker
- Organization: Intersex Equality Rights UK
- Notable work: Intersex-Inclusive Pride Flag (2021)

Valentino Vecchietti is an Italian-British intersex equality campaigner, writer, artist, and diversity speaker. She is the founder of Intersex Equality Rights and the creator of the Intersex-Inclusive Pride Flag. She was shortlisted for Campaigner of the Year at the British Diversity Awards in 2022. She is involved with universities on projects related to intersex human rights and provides consultation in the arts.

== Intersex-Inclusive Pride Flag ==
The Intersex-Inclusive Pride Flag, designed by Valentino Vecchietti in 2021.

She created the Intersex-Inclusive Pride Flag in 2021. This flag became a viral phenomenon and was internationally recognized as the new Pride Flag. The flag represents people with diverse sexual orientations, diverse gender identities and expressions, and diverse sex characteristics. She developed the rainbow stripes to include representation of diverse orientations, such as asexual and aromantic. The flag contains the purpose of all the previous iterations of the Pride flags, and contains representation for black, brown, people of color, and indigenous populations in the LGBTI+ community. It also recognizes the shame surrounding the people who are living with HIV/AIDS, and the people who have lost their lives to it. Lewis Hamilton wore the flag on his helmet at the Qatari and Saudi Arabian Grand Prix during the 2021 Formula One World Championship. The flag was included in the parade of the Platinum Jubilee of Elizabeth II.

== Intersex Equality Rights ==
Vecchietti founded Intersex Equality Rights in 2019. It is an intersex led organization that seeks to establish organized change through research, campaigns, and cultural engagement. The goal is the inclusion of marginalized people globally. Intersex Equality Rights was shortlisted for a Rainbow Honours Award in the category of Community Initiative with a charity in 2022 for adding the Intersex Flag to the Progress Pride Flag.

== Selected publications ==
- Crocetti, Daniela; Monro, Surya; Vecchietti, Valentino; Yeadon-Lee, Tray (2021). "Towards an Agency-based Model of Intersexuality, Variations of Sex Characteristics, and DSD Health". The European Journal of Public Health.
- Crocetti, Daniela; Monro, Surya; Vecchietti, Valentino; Yeadon-Lee, Tray (2020). "Towards an agency-based model of intersex, variations of sex characteristics (VSC) and DSD/dsd health". Culture, Health & Sexuality.
- Hegarty, Peter; Vecchietti, Valentino; Donnelly, Lois; Dutton, Paul Francis; Gillingham, Sara; Williams, Kaz (2020). "Understanding of Intersex: The Meanings of Umbrella Terms and Opinions About Medical and Social Responses Among Laypeople in the United States and United Kingdom". Psychology of Sexual Orientation and Gender Diversity.
- Parslow-Breen, Orla; Vecchietti, Valentino; Hegarty, Peter (2019). "Special Issue: Intersex and Psychology in Britain: A special issue of Psychology of Sexualities Review". Psychology of Sexualities Review.
