= Brighton Secondary School =

Location
- Adelaide, South Australia; Australia; 35.0038°S 138.5198°E

Information
- Type: Public
- Motto: Latin: Fac Omnia Bene (Do all things well)
- Established: 1952
- Principal: Rhoni McFarlane
- Faculty: 118
- Enrolment: 1500
- Campus: Urban
- Colours: Navy blue, green & gold
- Website: www.brightonss.sa.edu.au

Brighton Secondary School (formerly Brighton High School) is a zoned public school in North Brighton, a beach suburb of Adelaide, South Australia. The school provides secondary education from year 7 to 12, with special interest programs in music, volleyball, 'Think Bright', and STEM. Program entry into music and volleyball are competitive with the requirement of auditions or try outs. Entry into Think Bright and STEM are via written application, workshop and a conversation with staff. The STEM program has since been discontinued as of 2021, with the final class to graduate the 3 year program in 2022.

The school is involved in the F1 in Schools, an engineering initiative from the United Kingdom. The program is designed to educate students in engineering pathways, and the school has had teams in the national competition for the last three years.

== F1 in Schools Program ==
In the F1 in Schools community, Brighton Secondary School has 2 World Champion teams and 5 podium finishes (inclusive). Multiple teams from the school have progressed to the world competition including:

- Cold Fusion (2012) (1st Place)
- Odyssey (2013) (6th Place)
- Precision Racing (2015) (10th Place)
- Infinitude (2016) (2nd Place)
- Aurora (2017) (2nd Place)
- Horizon (2018) (1st Place)

Some of the teams were collaboration teams with other nations, notably, Odyssey (Republic of Ireland) and Aurora (Germany). Infinitude was also a collaboration team between Brighton Secondary School and St Bede's College (Mentone).

The school's team from 2016, Infinitude, currently holds the World Record for the fastest car at 0.916 seconds.

== Digital Learning and Apple Distinguishment ==
As of 2022, Brighton Secondary School has implemented a 3 year program to shift the school from being an Apple based school to a Windows based school. Middle school students in years 7-9, will use lower-end AMD Ryzen based Windows 10 Home laptops, while senior school students in years 10-12 will be provided a higher end AMD Ryzen based Windows 10 Home laptops. The shift to a Windows environment is estimated to be completed by 2024. These laptops are provided by the South Australian Government Department for Education and Child Development, and students will be able to finance these laptops over 3 year periods or pay upfront. After the 3 year billing cycle is complete for both of these laptops, ownership of the devices is transferred to the student.

Previously to 2022, Brighton Secondary School was an Apple Distinguished School; students in Year 8 and 9 were required to purchase and bring an Apple iPad to the school, while students from Year 10 to Year 12 were provided with a region-locked MacBook Air which they would finance over the 3 year period or pay upfront. If the student completed Year 12, the MacBook would transferred to their ownership, otherwise it would have been returned to the Department of Education.

Large components of the school, such as textbooks and work submission, is done digitally rather than on paper, though some lessons still require physical textbooks, worksheets, or books.

The Digital Learning Policy states that the school has permission to monitor ("monitor the content [...] conduct live monitoring") and publicly display information on the student's iPad, MacBook, or Windows laptop. ("Students' screens may be shared on any of the large display screens at the school") at any time. This can be performed by any teachers request, or by use of the required Apple Classroom or Meraki Mobile Device Management apps. Cisco Meraki's MDM also has the ability to see a live-view of the location of the device. All internet usage of any device on the school's network is monitored, filtered, and logged by the school, via use of Meraki systems and CyberHound software. CyberHound's ability to remove HTTPS security from webpages (SSL Stripping) and replace it with a falsified certificate (a Man-in-the-Middle attack) allows the school to inconspicuously monitor any specific searches or passwords the student enters.

== 2018 hack ==
On 2 October 2018 news broke to The Advertiser and HIT 107 that the school had been hacked by a group of students. It is believed that personal information, passwords, and security cameras were included in the breach. The school's principal, Olivia O'Neill stated in response: "On Friday 21 September I became aware that a small number of students had illegally obtained and used staff log-in details to gain unauthorised access to our school's computer systems". The school has said they are not sure of how much information has been accessed, and have not said how the information was accessed. The students had access to the Meraki and CyberHound security systems.

== In popular culture ==
The 2021 transgender vampire horror film So Vam was shot at Brighton Secondary School, directed by former student Alice Maio Mackay.

== Principals ==
- S.L. Tregenza (1952–1962)
- W.J. Bentley (1963–1968)
- W.E. Falkenberg (1969–1975)
- R.M. Farrow (1976–1987)
- G Nicol (1988–1993)
- N Schupelius (1993–2001)
- P Mitchell (2001–2003)
- T Potts (2004)
- O O'Neill (2005–2018)
- T Carellas (Jan 2019 – July 2019)
- T Lunniss (2019–2025)
- R McFarlane (2026-present)

== Notable alumni ==
- Jen Adams, National team lacrosse player
- Phil Alexander, Australian national baseball team player
- Mark Austin, Carlton Football Club and Western Bulldogs, Australian Football League player
- Nadia Clancy MP, State Member for Elder
- James Crawford, Judge of the International Court of Justice
- Bryce Gibbs, Carlton Football Club and Adelaide Football Club, Australian Football League player
- Michael Haysman, Former international cricketer, sports commentator
- Melody Horrill, journalist and author
- Hayden Jolly, Gold Coast Football Club, Australian Football League past player
- Eloise Jones, AFLW footballer (Adelaide Crows)
- Stephen Kernahan, Carlton Football Club, Australian Football League past player and now President
- David Kernahan, Essendon Football Club, Australian Football League past player
- Jess Kent, Australian singer
- Rachael Leahcar, Australian singer
- Alice Maio Mackay, filmmaker (dropped out)
- Chris McDermott, Adelaide Crows, Australian Football League past player
- Robert McFarlane, Photographer and photography critic
- Madison Newman, AFLW footballer (Adelaide Crows)
- Hannah Nielsen, National team lacrosse player
- Alan Noble, entrepreneur
- John Paynter, Sturt Football Club, South Australian National Football League past player
- Nathan Roberts, Volleyball for Australia over 300 games, London Olympian, World championships 2006, 2010, 2014
- James Sellar, Adelaide Crows and Melbourne Football Club, Australian Football League
- Sam Simmons, Australian comedian
- Gary Sweet, Australian actor
- Matt Tarrant, Australian magician and mentalist
- Bailey Williams, AFL footballer (Western Bulldogs)
