= Bad Girl Boogey =

2022 Australian horror film

- Film poster
- Directed by: Alice Maio Mackay
- Written by: Alice Maio Mackay; Benjamin Pahl Robinson
- Produced by: Alice Maio Mackay
- Starring: Lisa Fanto; Prudence Cassar; Steven Nguyen
- Cinematography: Aaron Schuppan
- Edited by: Aaron Schuppan
- Music by: Alexander Taylor
- Distributed by: Dark Star Pictures
- Release date: 2022
- Running time: 80 minutes
- Country: Australia
- Language: English
- Budget: $10,000 AUD

Bad Girl Boogey is a 2022 Australian horror film directed by Alice Maio Mackay, and co-written by Alice Maio Mackay and Benjamin Pahl Robinson. It stars Lisa Fanto, Prudence Cassar, Steven Nguyen, and Iris Mcerlean.

Its plot features queer teens Angel (Fanto) and her friend Dario (Mcerlean) as they seek to solve the mystery of a masked murderer who is seemingly fueled by bigotry and homophobia.

== Cast ==
- Lisa Fanto as Angel
- Prudence Cassar as Lila
- Steven Nguyen
- Toshiro Glenn as Chase
- Lewi Dawson as Clive
- Georgie Cufone as Sam
- Chris Asimos as Garry
- Artemis Bishop
- Em Bleby as Blair (as Emma Bleby)
- Kate Bonney as Aunt Carly
- Vincent Donato
- Mark Fantasia as Dom
- Molly Ferguson as Kelly
- Patty Glavieux as Mr. Kelly
- Hjalmar Marteinsson as Detective/Oskar
- Iris Mcerlean as Dario (as Ethan Mcerlean)
- Oscar Michalak as Finn
- Michelle Nightingale as Counsellor
- Erin Paterson as Dr. Sherri

== Production ==
Mackay was 16 years old when she began writing Bad Girl Boogey with Robinson, originally conceptualized as a short film. She wanted to make a gritty, queer, horror slasher inspired by the works of filmmakers Gregg Araki (such as Nowhere) and Rob Zombie.

As a recipient of a George A. Romero Fellowship, Mackay was mentored by director Jenn Wexler throughout the making of Bad Girl Boogey. She also received production support from Salem Horror Fest director Kay Lynch, who served as an executive director on the project. Part of the film's budget was funded through a campaign on the crowdfunding platform Indiegogo.

Mackay worked with local Australian bands Altar Boy and Teenage Joans for the film's soundtrack. Adele Shearwin, a fellow Australian film industry artist, assisted with SFX and simulated gore for the film. Production of Bad Girl Boogey wrapped in February 2022. It is Mackay's second feature film, following So Vam (2021).

== Release ==
Bad Girl Boogey held its world premiere at the Popcorn Frights Film Festival on August 21, 2022. It later premiered at the 2022 Australian Monster Fest and the 2022 Salem Horror Film Festival. The film was distributed by Dark Star Pictures with a digital release on July 4, 2023 and a limited theatrical release on July 7, 2023.

== Critical reception ==
As of November 23, 2025, the review aggregator website Rotten Tomatoes rates the film at 73% based on 11 critics' reviews.

Bad Girl Boogey has garnered positive reviews. Samantha Allen of Them noted the film's giallo influences, remarking how it was "gorgeously shot, drenched in neon" and praised its "punky queer Gen Z aesthetic."

R.C. Jara of Dread Central rated the film 5 out of 5 stars, celebrating the "brashness" of the film's cast and its use of "supernatural slasher tropes to interrogate the societal codes that leave queer people vulnerable to attacks."

Noel Murray of The Los Angeles Times gave a mixed review, citing the plot as "clunky" or "incoherent" at times, while praising its "slasher elements" and characterizing the film as "endearingly heartfelt."

Michelle Swope of Bloody Disgusting rated the film 4 out of 5 skulls, admiring many of its components and characterizing it as "an intense, bloody slasher that features compelling performances, gruesomely creative kills, and profound commentary."
