= Satranic Panic =

2023 Australian horror film

- Film poster
- Directed by: Alice Maio Mackay
- Written by: Cassie Hamilton; Alice Maio Mackay; Benjamin Pahl Robinson
- Produced by: Alice Maio Mackay; Erin Paterson
- Starring: Cassie Hamilton; Zarif; Lisa Fanto; Chris Asimos; Raúl-Xavier García
- Cinematography: Aaron Schuppan
- Edited by: Aaron Schuppan
- Music by: Alexander Taylor
- Distributed by: Dark Star Pictures
- Release date: 2023
- Running time: 80 minutes
- Country: Australia
- Language: English
- Budget: $10,000 AUD

Satranic Panic is a 2023 Australian horror film directed by Alice Maio Mackay, and co-written by Cassie Hamilton, Alice Maio Mackay, and Benjamin Pahl Robinson. It stars Cassie Hamilton, Zarif, Lisa Fanto, Chris Asimos and Raúl-Xavier García.

Its plot features trans drag queen Aria (Hamilton) and her non-binary friend Jay (Zarif) as they embark on a road trip across Australia while fighting demons to avenge the death of a loved one. The film is inspired by works such as Priscilla Queen of the Desert, Buffy the Vampire Slayer, and Robert Rodriguez films (such as Machete).

== Cast ==
Satranic Panic features a largely LGBT cast and crew.

- Cassie Hamilton as Aria
- Zarif as Jay
- Lisa Fanto as Nel
- Chris Asimos as Dr. Fenway
- Raúl-Xavier García as Drag Queen #2

== Production ==
Mackay shot Satranic Panic when she was 18 years old. It is Mackay's fourth feature film, following T Blockers.

== Release ==
Satranic Panic held its world premiere at SXSW Sydney on October 19, 2023. It later premiered at other events in 2023 such as the Melbourne Queer Film Festival, Outfest x American Cinematheque (U.S. premiere), Nitehawk/Future of Film is Female, Salem Horror December Double Feature, and the SOHO Horror Film Festival. The film was distributed by Dark Star Pictures and was released digitally on August 13, 2024.

== Reception ==
Satranic Panic has garnered positive reviews. Red Broadwell of Dread Central rated the film 4.5 out of 5 stars, praising its cinematography, comedic tone, and commentary on trans moral panic. They state, "Satranic Panic is Alice Maio Mackay’s most ambitious and stylish film yet, tackling transphobic fear-mongering at her new creative peak." They also compare elements of the film and its style to the works of David Lynch, Gregg Araki, Lizzie Borden, and Todd Haynes.

Alexandra Heller-Nicholas of the Alliance of Women Film Journalists highlights the film's audacity and joy. She states, "In Satranic Panic, like Mackay’s earlier movies, transphobia and homophobia kill, and there’s something extraordinarily powerful in how she weaves that hard truth into her vibrant supernatural horror scenarios."

Daniel Gorman of In Review Online celebrates the film's DIY aesthetics, likening it to the works of Gregg Araki and the Evil Dead movies. He states, "It’s all undeniably chintzy, but the lo-fi digital work is an essential part of the film’s charm."
