= Cassie Workman =

Australian singer-songwriter and comedian

Cassie Workman is an Australian comedian from Perth, Western Australia. In 2009, she was the winner of the Melbourne International Comedy Festival's Raw Comedy competition and was sent to the Edinburgh Fringe Festival. She has also written for Shaun Micallef's Mad as Hell and Aaron Chen Tonight. She is the host of the Youtube series Cassie Workman is Witchy AF.

Workman is a transgender woman, having come out in 2017. The ABC podcast The Signal documented her quest to save money for gender-affirming surgery, which was also featured in a 2018 feature article on "The hidden $100,000 price tag on being transgender". She contributed the regular segment "So You Think You Can Trans" on Tonightly with Tom Ballard, and in 2019 toured Giantess, a show about her transition .

She performed the Kurt Cobain tribute Aberdeen in 2022. She considers Cobain a "queer icon" and was inspired to name the show for his home town of Aberdeen, Washington, after traveling there "because it explained so much about him". The Guardian called the show "a darkly beautiful hour of spoken word... a sad and sorry voyage around Cobain’s stomping ground". She provided the voice of trans filmmaker Betty Palmer in the 2023 Alice Maio Mackay film T Blockers.

As of 2026 she is working on the animated comedy series Sorry About the Mess, produced by Melbourne animation studio Princess Bento with producer Mike Cowap and with executive producer Lilly Wachowski.
