= Alan Noble =

Alan Noble may refer to:

- Alan Noble (entrepreneur)
- Alan Noble (field hockey)
- Alan Noble (footballer)
