= T Blockers =

2023 Australian horror film

- Directed by: Alice Maio Mackay
- Written by: Alice Maio Mackay; Benjamin Pahl Robinson
- Produced by: Alice Maio Mackay; Erin Paterson
- Starring: Lauren Last; Lewi Dawson; Toshiro Glenn; Etcetera Etcetera
- Cinematography: Aaron Schuppan
- Edited by: Aaron Schuppan
- Music by: Alexander Taylor
- Release date: 2023
- Running time: 74 minutes
- Country: Australia
- Language: English
- Budget: $10,000

T Blockers is a 2023 Australian horror film directed by Alice Maio Mackay. The film centres on a young transgender woman in an Australian small town who becomes aware of parasites that are taking over the local men, and forms a vigilante group with her friends to get the problem under control.

== Plot ==
In the opening narration, a drag queen named Cryptessa (Etcetera Etcetera) tells the audience that the film is a work of fiction, but that it may be "realer than you think." She adds that "every one of us is a survivor in a lifeboat on a dark ocean." It is revealed that this is an excerpt from a lost film named Terror from Below made by a trans woman named Betty Palmer (Calliope Jackson, voiced by Cassie Workman) who lived in an Australian small town in the 1990s, and later committed suicide.

In the present day, Sophie (Lauren Last) is a young trans woman who lives in the same town, works at a cinema and spends time with her best friend Spencer (Lewi Dawson). Sophie is writing a screenplay based on her experience of coming out to her family when an earthquake hits. Later, she is preparing for her first date since transition. The date, with a cis man named Adam (Stanley Browning), appears to be going well until she sees a Grindr notification on his phone labelled "chicks with dicks" and leaves, realising he is a chaser. While Adam walks home stung by Sophie's rejection, he is confronted by a man who encourages his anger and misogyny. Adam is then introduced to a mysterious group of men that dip his head into a vat of green chemicals, from which he emerges smiling.

While drinking at a queer bar with Spencer, Sophie finds a flyer for a local alt-right protest in the bathroom. She also meets Kris (Toshiro Glenn), who helps the bar eject his friend Danny (Iris Mcerlean) after he makes violent and transphobic remarks. Sophie then finds a voicemail message left for her by Zen (Chris Asimos), a producer who expresses interest in one of her recent short films, though she does not call him back. Meanwhile, new Australian laws are proposed in which doctors prescribing hormone replacement therapy to children could be charged with child abuse. Cryptessa returns, telling the audience that "a locked door is only locked because someone locked it."

Sophie's brother London (Joe Romeo) comes to visit her, and the two smoke on her porch. He asks how her transition is going, and gives her an envelope full of cash from their father which she reluctantly accepts. London notes that their father has stopped drinking, and that he himself is "clean" from an unspecified drug addiction which he calls a "monster". "For you", he says, "the monster is on the outside."

Sophie meets Kris again when he sees a film at the cinema she works at, and invites him to happy hour at the queer bar. They also talk about the incident with Danny, who Kris reveals has become radicalised by watching Jordan Peterson and Ben Shapiro videos. When Sophie and Spencer go to happy hour, the bar is mostly deserted due to recent threats of violence against the queer community. Outside, Kris is being assaulted by a group of violent men, including Adam, until Sophie and her friends fight them off. She witnesses the gang hungrily feeding on the human entrails of a victim.

Spencer begins to notice parallels between what is happening around them and the events of Terror from Below. That film tells the story of a parasitic worm taking over the town's men and turning them into zombies, radicalising them into violent misogyny. Sophie watches the film with Spencer and realises it was made as a warning, and that the earthquake has reawakened the ancient worm. She then forms a masked vigilante group with her friends, and they begin executing the local men who have been infected.

Sophie's father drops by to say hello, and she thanks him for the money. He is a police officer, and the camera lingers on a badge she is wearing that reads "ACAB" on a trans flag background. He warns her to keep a low profile as recently queers have been going missing, and the police "have (their) hands tied". Cryptessa tells the audience about the warning signs of a slow descent into fascism, and ideas of "the other".

Sophie agrees to meet with Zen at a cafe, who patronisingly asks her to participate in a film festival he is organising. She and her friends then plan to burn down the building in which the zombified men are gathering. Once inside, they are confronted by the men and violently attack them with crowbars, poles, and baseball bats before setting their corpses on fire. Kris' neck is bitten by Adam, and he becomes one of the zombies himself as Sophie howls in grief. Once home, Sophie smashes her laptop and tells Spencer she is giving up, saying that Betty Palmer faced the same problems in the 1990s and committed suicide because she was not strong enough. Sophie also feels that life is hopeless as things will continue to get worse for trans people. Spencer talks Sophie around, saying that she is well-loved and that every victory is worth it.

They decide to attend the alt-right "T-Rally" (standing for "traditional values"), figuring this is where the parasite will seek more victims. She witnesses Adam passing the parasite onto another victim and violently executes him with a stake. Having defeated the parasite, she decides to make a film about the experience called Terror from Below 2 to carry on Betty Palmer's legacy and as a warning to future generations.

In the film's epilogue, Cryptessa warns the audience that they may not know who the person sitting next to them really is, and even who they really are themselves. Sophie and her friends return to the bar for a night out on the dance floor. They also drop Zen in a dumpster, telling him not to try to scam anyone again and adding, "Never fuck with queer filmmakers."

== Cast ==
- Lauren Last as Sophie
- Lewi Dawson as Spencer
- Toshiro Glenn as Kris
- Etcetera Etcetera as Cryptessa
- Lisa Fanto as Storm
- Stanley Browning as Adam
- Steven Thai Hoa as Crystal
- Joe Romeo as London
- Chris Asimos as Zen
- Brendan Cooney as Sophie's Dad
- James McCluskey Garcia as Suited Man
- Artemis Bishop as Actress
- Iris Mcerlean as Danny
- Cheryl Louise as Sophie's Mom
- Calliope Jackson (appears) and Cassie Workman (voiceover) as Betty Palmer
- Joni Ayton-Kent as Radio Host

== Production ==
Mackay made T Blockers in Adelaide at the age of 17 with a budget of $10,000. She was interested in exploring the theme of chasers:

We made [chasers] literal parasites to tell it from an angle that made sense for these characters. I could have told a grounded story but I feel it would be kind of depressing because there's no real world in which these characters are going to kill these shitty men - they're just going to have to deal with them and then the film ends. [As opposed to] getting to watch these trans characters actually reclaim their power and fight back against these alien villains, which I hope is cathartic.

She was influenced by the works of Gregg Araki, including Now Apocalypse and The Doom Generation, which also informed her use of bisexual lighting. She told ScreenHub that she loved Araki's "hyper-stylised worlds and authentic, uncensored queer stories, as well as the witty banter and sci-fi elements", and was also influenced by Buffy the Vampire Slayer for its "perfect amalgamation of girlhood, coming-of-age, teen friendship stuff, and those spooky horror elements... I love that combo because I can use it to tell stories about real, down-to-earth characters who all these interesting, over-the-top things happen to." The Cryptessa narration is an homage to Bela Lugosi's performance in Glen or Glenda. Other influences included Mallrats, The Munsters and Yoga Hosers.

== Critical reception ==
T Blockers was positively received by critics, having a 100% positive rating on Rotten Tomatoes. In the Star Observer, Stephen A. Russell compared the film to Buffy the Vampire Slayer and Stranger Things, "but heaps grungier and gayer." MovieWeb's Lauren Perry praised the film's "biting social commentary" as well as its "stylistic colors, energetic soundtrack, and punk-feminist tone", but added that the story felt rushed. In The Hollywood News, Kat Hughes wrote that the film "captures the frustrated exhaustion of the community's apparent constant need to justify their existence and channels it into a gleeful excuse to bring down their persecutors" and called Mackay "a vital voice in film-making". Anton Bitel of SciFi Now compared the film to the works of John Waters and Ed Wood "resurrected to address male insecurity and female solidarity in contemporary South Australia".
