= Carnage for Christmas =

2024 horror film

- Official release poster
- Directed by: Alice Maio Mackay
- Screenplay by: Alice Maio Mackay; Benjamin Pahl Robinson
- Starring: Jeremy Moineau
- Cinematography: Aaron Schuppan
- Edited by: Vera Drew
- Music by: Alexander Taylor
- Production company: One Manner Productions
- Release date: 4 May 2024 (Salem Horror Festival)
- Country: Australia
- Language: English

Carnage for Christmas is a 2024 Australian holiday horror film directed by Alice Maio Mackay from a screenplay by Mackay and Benjamin Pahl Robinson.

== Premise ==
Over the Christmas holiday, true crime podcaster Lola visits her home town for the first time since her gender transition. She becomes entangled in the town's mystery to discover whether the ghost of a historic murderer has returned.

== Cast ==
- Jeremy Moineau as Lola
- Dominique Booth as Danielle
- Zarif as Charlie
- Olivia Deeble as Riley
- Joe Romeo as Dave
- Yassica Switakowski as Kit
- Lewi Dawson as Kat
- Lisa Fanto as Abby
- Iris Mcerlean as Barry
- Toshiro Glenn
- Molly Ferguson as Sarah
- Cassie Hamilton as Farrah
- Tumelo Nthupi as Kent
- Betsey Brown as Radio Operator (voice)

== Production ==
Mackay was influenced by The Hardy Boys/Nancy Drew Mysteries and Murder, She Wrote.

== Release ==
Carnage for Christmas premiered at the Salem Horror Fest on May 4, 2024, screened at the 48th Frameline San Francisco International LGBTQ+ Film Festival as part of the Frameline Fangs program on June 22, 2024, and at the 28th Fantasia International Film Festival on July 19, 2024.

== Reception ==
On the review aggregator website Rotten Tomatoes, 88% of 16 critics' reviews are positive, with an average rating of 7.4/10. In his review on Screen Anarchy, J Hurtado said "Alice Maio Mackay may have reached the tipping point where her films can find that broader audience without sacrificing the edge that makes them unique, and Carnage for Christmas is evidence that she's just going to keep getting better."

== See also ==
- Christmas horror
