= Tonightly with Tom Ballard =

Australian comedy TV series (2017–2018)

- Genre: Comedy
- Presented by: Tom Ballard
- Starring: Bridie Connell; Greg Larsen; Nina Oyama
- Country of origin: Australia
- Original language: English
- No. of seasons: 1
- No. of episodes: 160

Production
- Production locations: Sydney, New South Wales
- Running time: 30 minutes

Original release
- Network: ABC Comedy
- Release: 4 December 2017 – 7 September 2018

Tonightly with Tom Ballard is an Australian comedy entertainment show presented by comedian Tom Ballard and regular contributors Bridie Connell, Greg Larsen, Greta Lee Jackson and Nina Oyama. It aired on ABC Comedy from 4 December 2017 until 7 September 2018. The show was described as an "irreverent, fast-paced" look at the day in news and culture, with Ballard calling it "undergraduate filth". Tonightly with Tom Ballard was filmed a few hours before broadcast from the studios of the ABC's Ultimo headquarters.

== Reception ==
An early review of Tonightly with Tom Ballard was positive, saying "the writing is top notch, the performances strong and getting stronger, and the filmed inserts are beautifully realised."

The show was criticised after a skit called Kevin Bailey, the candidate for the Australian Conservatives in the 2018 Batman by-election, a "cunt", with the leader of the party, Cory Bernardi, and the Education Minister, Simon Birmingham calling for someone to lose their job over it, and the Minister for Communications, Mitch Fifield asking for an investigation and an apology to Mr Bailey. The ABC later personally apologised to Mr Bailey, but defended the decision to air the segment, while expressions of support for the show were made by Joe Hildebrand, Wil Anderson and Annabel Crabb.

In August 2018, the show received criticism for a musical segment which highlighted perceived contradictions between Prime Minister Scott Morrison's Christian faith and his actions as a politician. The ABC rejected the suggestion that the segment "attack[ed]" Morrison's religion or religious beliefs, stating that "[m]ost viewers would understand the skit to be a satirical way of examining the relationship between such beliefs and government policies on asylum seekers".

'Sex Pest', a song from the series performed by Bridie Connell and Wyatt Nixon-Lloyd, won the 2018 ARIA Award for Best Comedy Release. Tonightly Albumly, a collection of original songs from the series' run, was released on all digital services via ABC Music.

== Discontinued ==
In mid-August 2018 it was announced that Tonightly with Tom Ballard would be dropped from the ABC line up and would air for the last time on 7 September 2018.

== Episodes ==
This is a list of episodes for Tonightly with Tom Ballard which aired on ABC Comedy from 4 December 2017, to 7 September 2018.

Ep.	Date aired	Guests	Segments
1	Monday, 4 December 2017		Gardening with Greta
2	Tuesday, 5 December 2017		Tom looks at the Parliament House fence
3	Wednesday, 6 December 2017		Year In Review: Same Sex Marriage
4	Thursday, 7 December 2017	Tracey Spicer	
5	Friday, 8 December 2017		Best of the week.
6	Monday, 11 December 2017		Year in Review: WA-XIT
7	Tuesday, 12 December 2017		Tom goes to the Australian Christian Lobby conference. Christmas song.
8	Wednesday, 13 December 2017	Warren Mundine	Tom interviews Senators Derryn Hinch, Sam Dastyari, Eric Abetz, Sarah Hanson-Young, David Leyonhjelm
9	Thursday, 14 December 2017		Year In Review: Trump
10	Friday, 15 December 2017		Best of the week.
11	Monday, 18 December 2017		Year in Review: The World
12	Tuesday, 19 December 2017	Omar Musa	Bridie's Goon commercial.
13	Wednesday, 20 December 2017		Tom looks at the Australian Constitution.
14	Thursday, 21 December 2017		Year in Review: Indigenous issues.
15	Friday, 22 December 2017		Best of the week.
16	Monday, 8 January 2018		
17	Tuesday, 9 January 2018		Explainsly: Centrelink robo-debt
18	Wednesday, 10 January 2018		Greg crashes Mark Latham's 'Save Australia Day' campaign launch. Bridie investigates Queensland's racist place names.
19	Thursday, 11 January 2018	Jimmy Carr	
20	Friday, 12 January 2018	Masha Alyokhina from Pussy Riot	Best of the week.
21	Monday, 15 January 2018		
22	Tuesday, 16 January 2018		Explainsly: 2018 preview part 1
23	Wednesday, 17 January 2018		Explainsly: 2018 preview part 2
24	Thursday, 18 January 2018	Panti Bliss	
25	Friday, 19 January 2018		Best of the week.
26	Monday, 22 January 2018		Izzy Ali looks at Victorian African gangs.
27	Tuesday, 23 January 2018	Demi Lardner	Explainsly: NZ refugee policy.
28	Wednesday, 24 January 2018	Comedian Trygvie.	
29	Thursday, 25 January 2018	Jacinta Price	Craig Quatermaine looks at Australia Day.
30	Friday, 26 January 2018		Best of the week.
31	Monday, 29 January 2018	Senator Jacqui Lambie	
32	Tuesday, 30 January 2018	NSW Greens Senator Mehreen Faruqi	Andrew McClelland goes to the Parkes Elvis Festival in NSW.
33	Wednesday, 31 January 2018	Labor Opposition Leader Bill Shorten	
34	Thursday, 1 February 2018	Liberal MP Tim Wilson	
35	Friday, 2 February 2018		Best of the week.
36	Monday, 5 February 2018		Mark Bonanno from Aunty Donna looks at Melbourne's tram car restaurants
37	Tuesday, 6 February 2018	Wolf Alice	Candy Bowers looks at nude underwear
38	Wednesday, 7 February 2018	Harley Breen	
39	Thursday, 8 February 2018	Alex Cameron	Wyatt Nixon-Lloyd looks at the 200 Treasures exhibition at the Australian Museum.
40	Friday, 9 February 2018		Best of the week.
41	Monday, 12 February 2018	Tom Walker	
42	Tuesday, 13 February 2018	Dr Chris Sarra	Wyatt & Bridie go to the Tamworth Country Music Festival
43	Wednesday, 14 February 2018	Sharri Markson	Valentines Day song.
44	Thursday, 15 February 2018		Explainsly: Renewables
45	Friday, 16 February 2018		Best of the week.
46	Monday, 19 February 2018	Danielle Walker	Aaron Chen goes to Tropfest
47	Tuesday, 20 February 2018	Musical act Jade Bird	
48	Wednesday, 21 February 2018		
49	Thursday, 22 February 2018	Musical act Vance Joy	
50	Friday, 23 February 2018		Best of the week.
51	Monday, 26 February 2018	Imam Nur Warsame	
52	Tuesday, 27 February 2018	Courtney Act	
53	Wednesday, 28 February 2018	Writer of the 2018 TV movie Riot Greg Waters & LGBTQI activist Meredith Knight	Greg interviews John Boyega
54	Thursday, 1 March 2018	Geraldine Hickey, Zahra Stardust	Cassie Workman's segment So You Think You Can Trans.
55	Friday, 2 March 2018		Best of the week.
56	Monday, 5 March 2018	Lea DeLaria	Felicty Ward interview Greta Gerwig and Saoirse Ronan
57	Tuesday, 6 March 2018	Gillian Triggs, standup from Nina Oyama	
58	Wednesday, 7 March 2018	The Preatures	Bridie interview New Zealand Foreign Minister Winston Peters
59	Thursday, 8 March 2018	Ioan Gruffudd	Bridie and Greta host.
60	Friday, 9 March 2018		Best of the week.
61	Monday, 12 March 2018	Henry Rollins	
62	Tuesday, 13 March 2018	Dr Jordan Peterson	
63	Wednesday, 14 March 2018	Musical act Lauv	
64	Thursday, 15 March 2018	Musical act Vera Blue	Greg wants to rename the electorate of Batman & famously calls Conservative Kevin Bailey the c-word.
65	Friday, 16 March 2018		Best of the week.
66	Monday, 19 March 2018	Tessa Waters	Nina goes to Adelaide to cover the South Australian election
67	Tuesday, 20 March 2018	Brian Greene	
68	Wednesday, 21 March 2018	Hip hop act Horrorshow	Felicity Ward interviews Leslie Mann, Kay Cannon & John Cena. Strayans Divided: Young Politicians.
69	Thursday, 22 March 2018	Michael Hing	Explainsly: Endometriosis.
70	Friday, 23 March 2018		Best of the week.
71	Monday, 26 March 2018	Chuck D and Tom Morello from the band Prophets of Rage, Tommy Dassalo	Scott Dooley goes to the anti-gun March For Our Lives in Washington.
72	Tuesday, 27 March 2018	Paul McDermott, Nikki Britton	
73	Wednesday, 28 March 2018	Loyiso Gola	Strayans Divided: Economists
74	Thursday, 29 March 2018	Phil Wang	Explainsly: Crime and Punishment
75	Friday, 30 March 2018		Best of the week.
76	Monday, 2 April 2018	Frida Deguise	Cassie Workman talks pronouns in the segment So You Think You Can Trans.
77	Tuesday, 3 April 2018	Marcel Lacont (Alexis Dubus)	Tom goes to the Victorian Marxism conference.
78	Wednesday, 4 April 2018	Jack River	Strayans Divided: The Republic vs Monarchists, featuring Peter FitzSimons. Greg reports from the Gold Coast Commonwealth Games.
79	Thursday, 5 April 2018	Former Deputy Prime Minister and Treasurer Wayne Swan	Greta goes to the Taroom B&S Ball.
80	Friday, 6 April 2018		Best of the week.
81	Monday, 9 April 2018	Fin Taylor	
82	Tuesday, 10 April 2018	Patrick Wolf	
83	Wednesday, 11 April 2018	Fern Brady	Greg is at the Gold Coast Commonwealth Games.
84	Thursday, 12 April 2018	Doug Stanhope, Didirri	
85	Friday, 13 April 2018		Best of the week.
86	Monday, 16 April 2018	Guy Montgomery	
87	Tuesday, 17 April 2018	Apollo Jackson, Damien Power	
88	Wednesday, 18 April 2018	Missy Higgins	Tom looks at refugee art.
89	Thursday, 19 April 2018	Cassie Workman	
90	Friday, 20 April 2018		Best of the week.
91	Monday, 23 April 2018	Dane Baptiste	Tom looks at Camp Gallipoli.
92	Tuesday, 24 April 2018	Veteran Mick Bainbridge, Michael Goldstein	
93	Wednesday, 25 April 2018	Dami Im	Bridie looks at laws protecting university colleges
94	Thursday, 26 April 2018	Takashi Wakasugi	James Colley goes to Federation Square in Melbourne
95	Friday, 27 April 2018		Best of the week.
96	Monday, 30 April 2018	Bill McGibben, DMA's	
97	Tuesday, 1 May 2018	Musician Dean Lewis	Strayans Divided: Religion
98	Wednesday, 2 May 2018	Author Stanley Johnson, Musical act Tropical Fuck Storm	
99	Thursday, 3 May 2018	Journalist Johann Hari	Monty Franklin tries to find a new US Ambassador. Cam Knight stars as swearing teacher Kunst.
100	Friday, 4 May 2018		Best of the week.
101	Monday, 18 June 2018		Explainsly: Refugee sponsorship
102	Tuesday, 19 June 2018	Anyier Youl	Greta proposes lock in laws for men. Greg looks at psychic sniffer dogs.
103	Wednesday, 20 June 2018	Standup from Squidsy Mulligan	Greta Investigatesly: Refugees.
104	Thursday, 21 June 2018	Hip hop artist DyspOra, performing "Open Road" with Elsy Wameyo	Home 'n Hosed's Declan Byrne chats to three refugees making music in Australia.
105	Friday, 22 June 2018		Best of the week.
106	Monday, 25 June 2018	Hypnotist John Edward	
107	Tuesday, 26 June 2018	Standup from Alice Fraser	
108	Wednesday, 27 June 2018	Alex Ward	Hannah Reilly sets up a safe space for right wing journalists and broadcasters.
109	Thursday, 28 June 2018	The Rubens	Explainsly: Facial recognition.
110	Friday, 29 June 2018		Best of the week.
111	Monday, 2 July 2018	NT Labor MP Luke Gosling	
112	Tuesday, 3 July 2018	Body hacker Meow-Ludo Disco Gamma Meow-Meow	
113	Wednesday, 4 July 2018	Comedian Ashwin Segkar	Strayans Divided: Feminism
114	Thursday, 5 July 2018	Musical group Polo Shirt	
115	Friday, 6 July 2018		Best of the week.
116	Monday, 9 July 2018	Steph Tisdell	Bridie goes to UK Labor Live concert and interviews Jeremy Corbyn
117	Tuesday, 10 July 2018	Shireen Morris	
118	Wednesday, 11 July 2018	Ngaree Ah Kit	Andy Saunders' Aboriginal MythBusters
119	Thursday, 12 July 2018	Musicians Alice Skye & Emily Wurramara	
120	Friday, 13 July 2018		Best of the week.
121	Monday, 16 July 2018	Actor Danny Glover, Comedian Kristy Webeck	
122	Tuesday, 17 July 2018	Musical group Bully	Strayans Divided: Greens vs One Nation.
123	Wednesday, 18 July 2018	Bianca "Bam Bam" Elmir	Greg goes to the NT to look at the crocodile cull.
124	Thursday, 19 July 2018	Musical act Mansionair	
125	Friday, 20 July 2018		Best of the week.
126	Monday, 23 July 2018	Interview with Albert Hammond Jr from The Strokes	Damien Power looks at guns in America – a co-production with The New York Times opinion section.
127	Tuesday, 24 July 2018	Comedian Jack Druce	Strayans Divided: Big Australia
128	Wednesday, 25 July 2018	Comedian Tom Cashman	Rosie Waterland parodies Netflix's Insatiable. Greg goes to the Longman by-election in Queensland.
129	Thursday, 26 July 2018	Interview with Franz Ferdinand. Musical performance by Odette	Nina goes to the Braddon by-election in Tasmania.
130	Friday, 27 July 2018		Best of the week.
131	Monday, 30 July 2018	Comedian Rose Piper	
132	Tuesday, 31 July 2018	Economist Stephen Koukoulas	Carlo Ritchie looks at health in country.
133	Wednesday, 1 August 2018		
134	Thursday, 2 August 2018	Band Cash Savage and the last drinks	Carlo Ritchie looks at infrastructure in country. Bridie looks at abortion rights in Ireland and Tasmania.
135	Friday, 3 August 2018		Best of the week.
136	Monday, 6 August 2018	Hamish Blake, Andy Lee, Dave Eastgate	
137	Tuesday, 7 August 2018	Musicians D.Minor & Libby Ingels	Tom looks at racism in Townsville
138	Wednesday, 8 August 2018	Skye Leckie	Nina's Alternatively looks at homelessness
139	Thursday, 9 August 2018	Comedian Bonnie Tangey	Explainsly: Homelessness and housing first
140	Friday, 10 August 2018		Best of the week.
141	Monday, 13 August 2018	Author Douglas Murray, Comedian Craig Quartermaine	The Embassy episode 1
142	Tuesday, 14 August 2018	Musician Peter Bibby	The Embassy episode 2
143	Wednesday, 15 August 2018	Musician/Comedian Sarah Gaul	Tonightly gets axed. Mr Oily debuts in new segment "Why The Fuck Not?". The Embassy episode 3.
144	Thursday, 16 August 2018	Professor Toby Walsh	
145	Friday, 17 August 2018		Best of the week.
146	Monday, 20 August 2018	Comedian Zoe Coombs Marr	Kamahl reads the Gettysburg address for "Why The Fuck Not?"
147	Tuesday, 21 August 2018	Courtney Barnett	Day of the Liberal leadership spill against Turnbull.
148	Wednesday, 22 August 2018	Former UKIP leader Nigel Farage, musical comedy act Songtourage	Greg & Nina host.
149	Thursday, 23 August 2018	American Peter Dutton. Comedian Sian Smith	Bridie and Greta host day Turnbull announces another spill.
150	Friday, 24 August 2018		Best of the week.
151	Monday, 27 August 2018	Andrew WK	Wyatt & Bridie do a song about new PM Scott Morrison's Christianity.
152	Tuesday, 28 August 2018	Gillian Cosgriff, Jess Perkins, Ahmed Zubb	Special standup comedy episode
153	Wednesday, 29 August 2018	Interview with singer Troye Sivan, Comedian Michael Chamberlin	
154	Thursday, 30 August 2018	Comedian Sam Taunton	Comedian Andy Matthews looks at DIY DNA kids. Tom Cashman stars in Emotional Jackass.
155	Friday, 31 August 2018		Best of the week.
156	Monday, 3 September 2018	Greens leader Richard Di Natale, comedian Chris Fleming	Special Conservative-themed show, "Conservatively". James McCann looks at modern art. Jazz Twemlow looks at everything that's wrong the left.
157	Tuesday, 4 September 2018	Musical comedy act These New South Whales	Special future show set in 2068
158	Wednesday, 5 September 2018	Comedian John Cruckshank	Explainsly: Tom explains Australia's Environmental policy failures. Rodney Todd looks at heightism.
159	Thursday, 6 September 2018		Final Original Episode, ran 51 minutes. Nina's Alternatively looks at African gangs. Greg looks at Australia Post. Monica Zanetti looks at moving to the country for queer people.
160	Friday, 7 September 2018		The Best Ever – hour long special.

== Discography ==
=== Albums ===
List of albums
Title	Album details
Tonightly Album	Released: October 2018; Label: ABC; Formats: download

== Awards and nominations ==
=== ARIA Music Awards ===
The ARIA Music Awards are a set of annual ceremonies presented by Australian Recording Industry Association (ARIA), which recognise excellence, innovation, and achievement across all genres of the music of Australia. They commenced in 1987.

Year	Nominee / work	Award	Result	Ref.
2018	"Sex Pest" (by Bridie and Wyatt & Tonightly with Tom Ballard)	Best Comedy Release	Won	
