= StartupAUS =

Defunct Australian not-for-profit organization

StartupAUS was an Australian not-for-profit organization. StartupAUS was disbanded in 2021 and subsumed by the newly formed Tech Council of Australia.

== Early history ==
In March 2013, Alan Noble, then at Google Australia, convened a meeting of 50 members of Australia's tech startup community. Later, in May 2013, StartupAUS was founded by Alan Noble, Peter Bradd (then at Fishburners) and Bill Bartee (then at Southern Cross Venture Partners). The board was later joined by Stephen Baxter (then at River City Labs), Jana Matthews, and others.
