= Bisexual flag =

Pride flag

- Use: Symbol of the bisexual community
- Proportion: 3:5
- Adopted: 1998
- Design: Three solid horizontal bars: two fifths pink, one fifth purple, and two fifths blue.
- Designed by: Michael Page

The bisexual flag, also called the bisexual pride flag, is a pride flag representing bisexuality, bisexual individuals and the bisexual community. According to Michael Page, the activist who created the flag based on a color palette designed by Liz Nania, the pink stripe represents attraction to the same sex, while the blue stripe represents attraction to the opposite sex. The purple stripe, the resulting "overlap" of the blue and pink stripes, represents attraction to both sexes.

Page designed the flag to increase the visibility of bisexuals among society as a whole and within the LGBTQ community. He aimed to give the bisexual community a symbol that is comparable to the rainbow flag for the greater LGBTQ community. The first bisexual pride flag was unveiled at the BiCafe's first anniversary party on December 5, 1998.

== Design and colors ==
The biangles are a symbol of bisexuality, designed by artist Liz Nania, from which Michael Page stated that he took the colors and overlap for the bisexual pride flag, which he created

Page stated that he took the colors and overlap for the flag from the biangles, symbol of bisexuality. The biangles symbol of bisexuality was designed by artist Liz Nania as she co-organized a bisexual contingent for the Second National March on Washington for Lesbian and Gay Rights in 1987. The design of the biangles began with the pink triangle, a Nazi concentration camp badge that later became a symbol of gay liberation representing homosexuality. The addition of a blue triangle contrasts the pink and represents heterosexuality. The two triangles overlap and form lavender, which represents the "queerness of bisexuality", referencing the Lavender Menace and 1980s and 1990s associations of lavender with queerness.

Page described the meaning of the pink, purple, and blue colors:

The pink color represents sexual attraction to the same sex only (gay and lesbian). The blue represents sexual attraction to the opposite sex only (straight) and the resultant overlap color purple represents sexual attraction to both sexes (bi). The key to understanding the symbolism of the Bi Pride Flag is to know that the purple pixels of color blend unnoticeably into both the pink and blue, just as in the 'real world,' where bi people blend unnoticeably into both the gay/lesbian and straight communities.

Since the original design, the purple overlap has been reinterpreted and is now widely understood to represent attraction regardless of sex or gender.

The flag is used in different aspect ratios; 2:3 and 3:5 are often used, in common with many other flags.

In vexillological terms, the bisexual pride flag is a simple horizontal tricolor.

Official		Unofficial		
Colour named as	Pantone (PMS)	RGB	Hex triplet	Color
Magenta (pink)	226	214, 2, 112	#D60270	
Lavender (purple)	258	155, 79, 150	#9B4F96	
Royal (blue)	286	0, 56, 168	#0038A8	

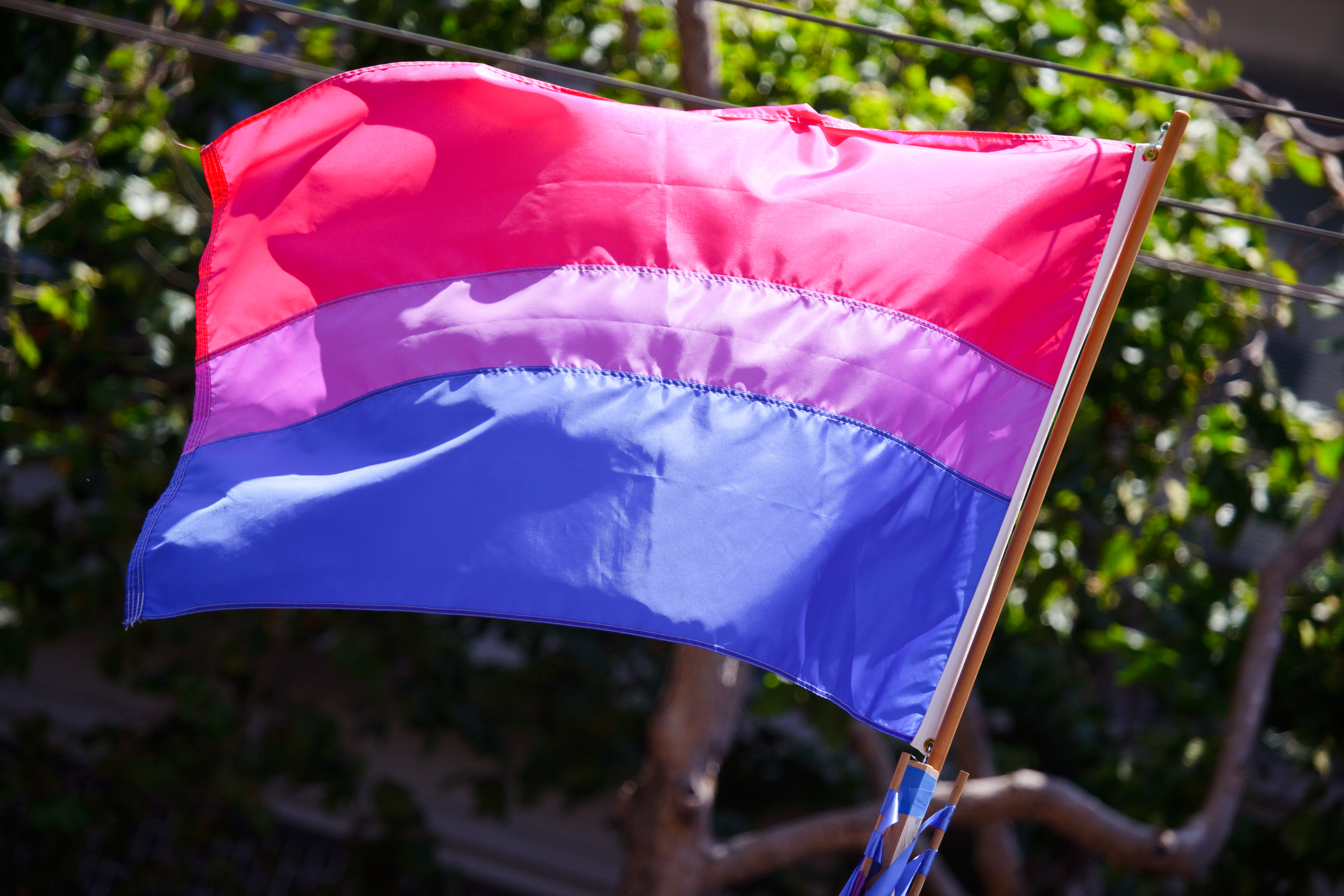
A physical version of the bisexual pride flag

The pink stripe takes up two fifths of the flag, the purple stripe takes up the middle fifth, and the blue stripe takes up the other two fifths. The flag has been most commonly oriented with the pink stripe at the top, but both orientations are acceptable. The flag is not patented, trademarked, or service marked.

== Variation ==
The bisexual pride flag is used in different aspect ratios; 2:3 and 3:5 are often used, in common with many other flags.

== Licensing controversy ==
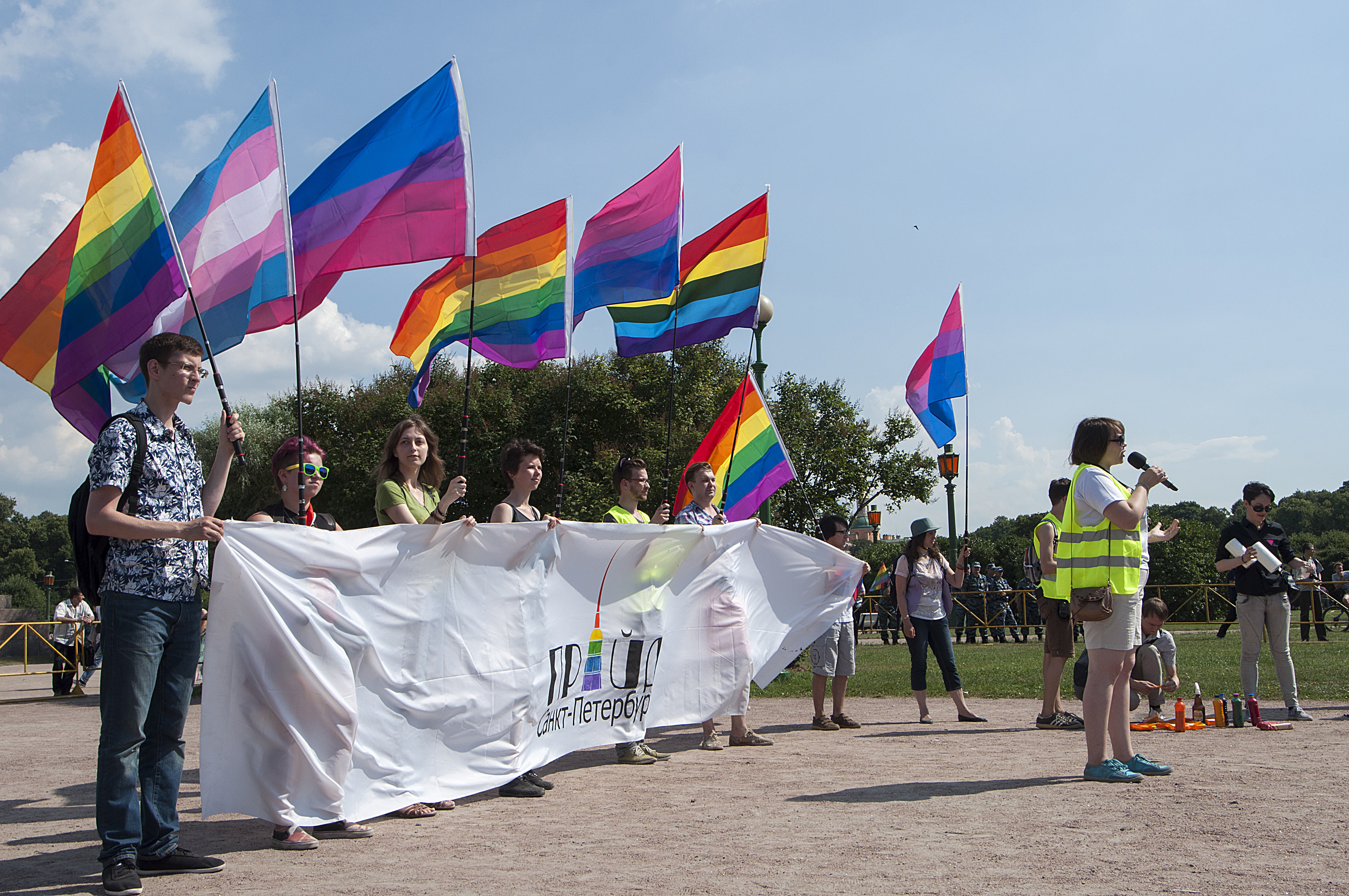
Public event as part of the Fifth Saint Petersburg Pride, held in the Field of Mars in Saint Petersburg, 2014. Along with the bisexual flag is the transgender flag and the rainbow flag.

In 1998, Page stated that the bisexual pride flag was "for free public and commercial use" and that it was "not patented, trademarked or service marked". In April 2020, BiNet USA falsely claimed that it was the sole copyright owner of the flag and flag colors, and said organizations and individuals who wished to use the flag for commercial purposes would be required to obtain a license from the organization, despite having nothing to do with the flag's design or creation. BiNet's claim and the resulting controversy were covered by Out and LGBTQ Nation, which cast doubt on BiNet's claim and noted that the flag is not eligible for copyright.

BiNet USA ultimately ceased to use the flag on May 8, 2020, opting instead to use a different design.

== Similar symbols representing bisexuality ==
=== Biangles ===
The biangles, designed by artist Liz Nania to represent bisexuality

The biangles were designed by artist Liz Nania, as she co-organized a bisexual contingent for the Second National March on Washington for Lesbian and Gay Rights in 1987. The design of the biangles began with the pink triangle, a Nazi concentration camp badge that later became a symbol of gay liberation representing homosexuality. The addition of a blue triangle contrasts the pink and represents heterosexuality. The two triangles overlap and form lavender, which represents the "queerness of bisexuality", referencing the Lavender Menace and 1980s and 1990s associations of lavender with queerness.

=== Bisexual lighting ===
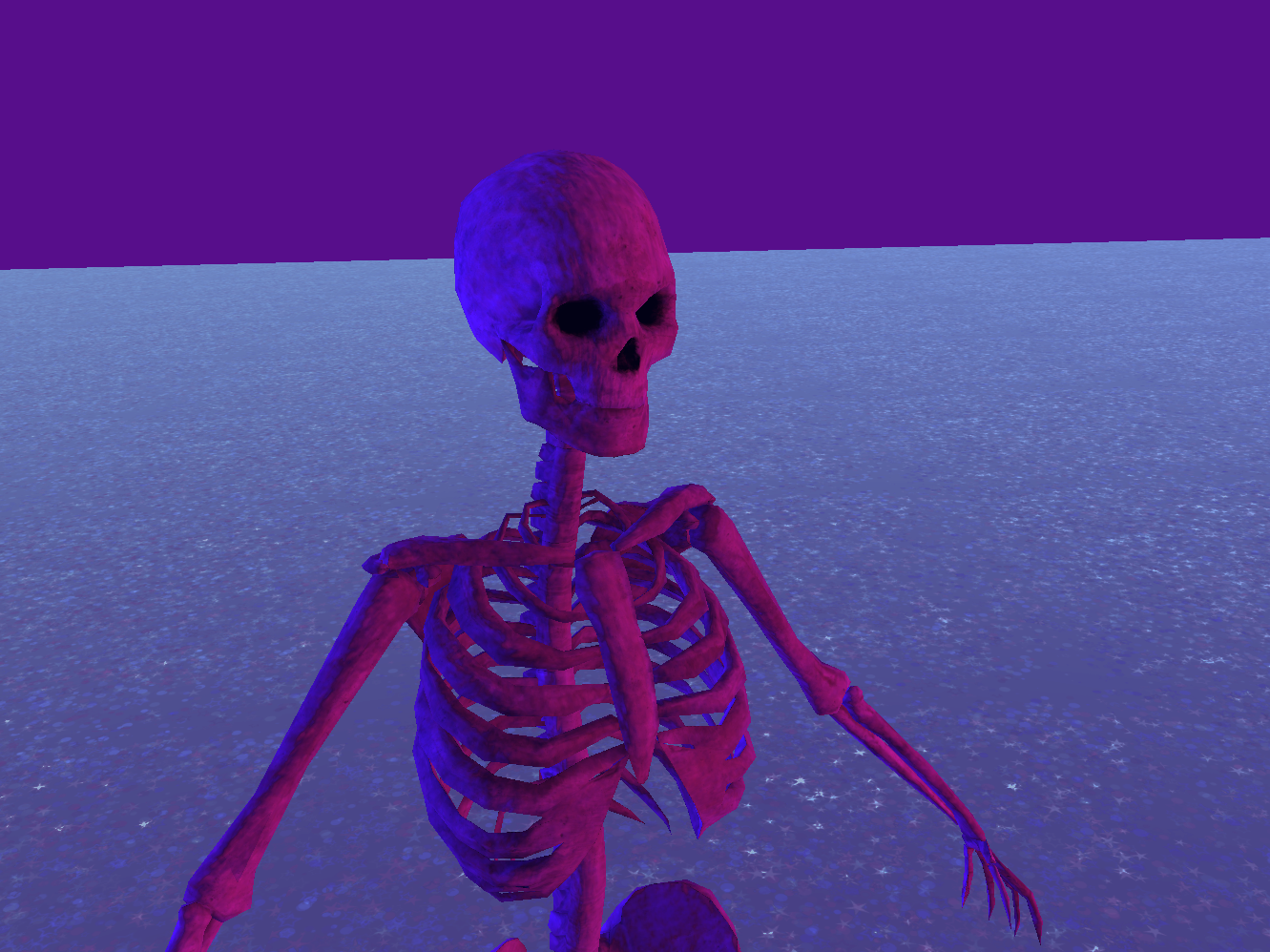
A 3D rendering of a skeleton showcasing bisexual lighting

Bisexual lighting is the simultaneous use of pink, purple, and blue lighting and is used to represent bisexual characters. The colors may be a direct reference to the bisexual pride flag. Bisexual lighting has been used in studio lighting for film and television, and has been observed in the cinematography of various films. According to BOWIE Creators, the concept of bisexual lighting was invented in 2014 by a Tumblr fan of Sherlock who believed that the lighting was being used to signal that Dr. Watson was bisexual and would eventually be in a romantic relationship with Sherlock Holmes.

=== Double crescent moon ===
Because many bisexuals objected to the use of the biangles symbol involving the Nazi-associated pink triangle, Vivian Wagner designed the double crescent moon symbol as an alternative way to symbolize bisexuality.

The double crescent moon bisexuality symbol with bisexual flag colors, designed by Vivian Wagner

Another version of the double crescent moon bisexuality symbol with bisexual flag colors

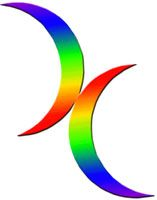
A version of the double crescent moon bisexuality symbol with rainbow flag colors

=== Trillium ===
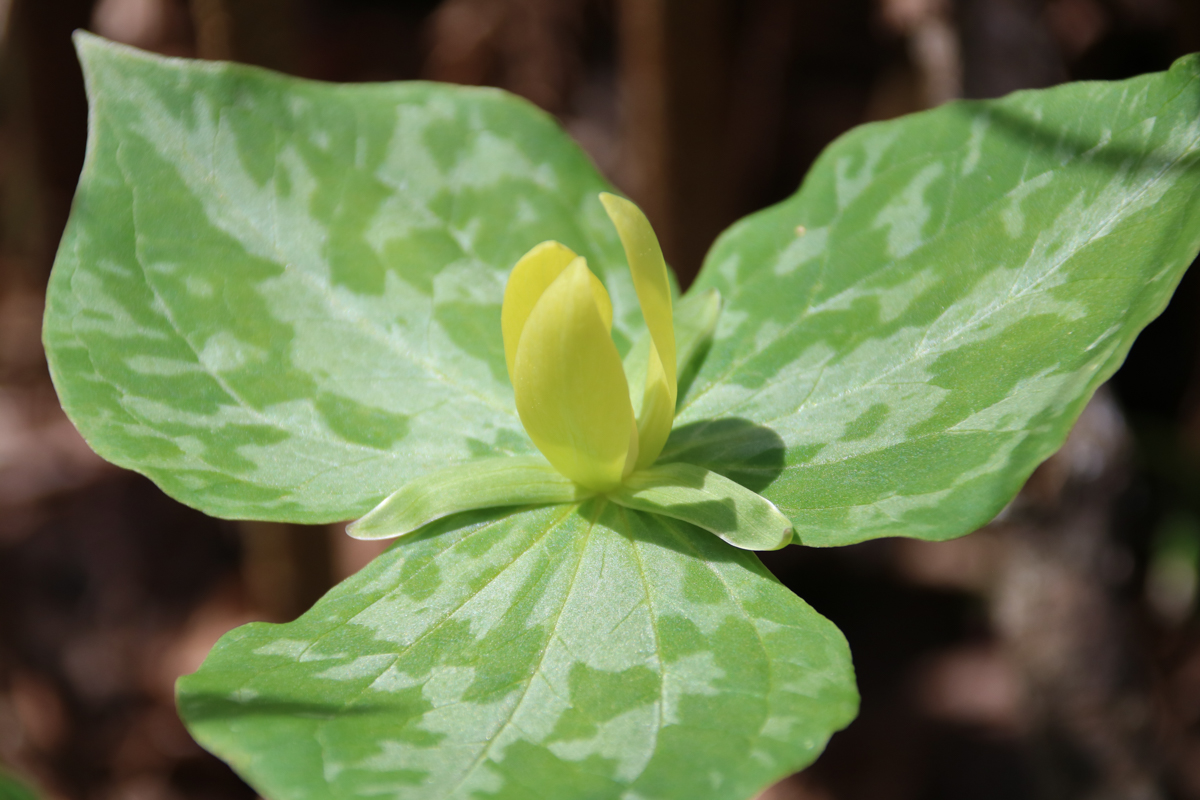
The trillium flower is another symbol of bisexuality

In 1999, Michael Page established the use of the trillium flower as a symbol of bisexuality. This was a pun, as scientists had used the term "bisexual" to refer to the flower because such flowers have both male and female reproductive organs.

== See also ==
- Bisexuality in the United States
- Bisexual community
- Bisexual lighting
- Celebrate Bisexuality Day
- LGBTQ symbols
