= Alice Maio Mackay =

Australian film director

- Born: 4 August 2004 (age 22); Adelaide, South Australia

Alice Maio Mackay (born 4 August 2004) (Note: On 3 August 2025, Mackay wrote on Twitter that her 21st birthday would take place on 4 August.) is an Australian filmmaker. Born in Adelaide, Mackay began producing, writing, directing and occasionally acting in horror films as a teenager, also coming out as a transgender woman around the same time. Many of her films deal with issues faced by the trans community; a recurring motif in her work is transphobia expressed in the form of monsters, vampires or zombies. To date, she has released seven feature films.

== Early life ==
Mackay grew up in Adelaide. She was taken to The Phantom of the Opera at age three and cites this experience as an early influence. She attended music school as a child and studied composition while learning piano, guitar and bassoon. She wrote short stories and entered them into competitions before making her first short film at age 12. She dropped out of Brighton Secondary School at age 16 and moved to Sydney, though she often returns to Adelaide to shoot her films. She has never attended film school apart from a brief attempt at a TAFE course, which she dropped out of to instead learn from observing filming on the sets of Adelaide's We Made a Thing Studios.

== Career ==
In 2018, she released the Lego stop-motion silent short "Bestia" and entered it into the International Youth Silent Film Festival. This early work was credited to "One Manner Productions", a name she continues to use today. In 2019, at age 14, she released A Tale of the Laundry Game, an adaptation of the short story by Stephen King to which Maio Mackay had obtained the rights for $1 under King's Dollar Baby initiative. The film debuted at Monster Fest. That year Mackay also worked on a musical short film entitled "Rot n' Roll" starring Eddie Perfect, and another project titled "Sweet Nothings" which featured Greg Sestero. She also contributed to the ABC TV series First Day about a transgender teen beginning high school, for which she was not paid. Mackay later described the atmosphere on set as "transphobic (and) vile", saying the experience cemented her disgust with the Australian film industry and decision not to seek its approval. In 2020 and 2021, she released several short films including "The Serpent's Nest" and "Tooth 4 Tooth."

Her first feature film, So Vam, was shot when Maio Mackay was 16 and also released in 2021. It was the first of several collaborations with screenwriter Benjamin Pahl Robinson, who lives in Argentina and has never met her in person. The film screened at the Iris Prize film festival in Cardiff and later acquired by streaming service Shudder. While So Vam was in post-production, Mackay also worked on an "experimental queer drama" short film written with Laneikka Denne entitled "On VHS" that has apparently not been released. Her second feature, the slasher Bad Girl Boogey, was shot at Brighton Secondary School which Mackay formerly attended. She described the institution as "supportive"; they also asked her to return and speak to current students despite the fact that she had dropped out.. The film premiered at Monster Fest 2022, later screening at the Salem Horror Fest in Salem, Massachusetts. That year she also released a short film adaptation of the Ed Wood short story "Howl of the Werewolf."

In 2023, she released two more feature films, T Blockers and Satranic Panic. Satranic Panic was written collaboratively with Mackay's housemate Cassie Hamilton. In 2024, she released Carnage for Christmas. She also appeared in an acting role in Louise Weard's Castration Movie. Her sixth feature, The Serpent's Skin, was released in 2025. Her seventh feature, Our Effed Up World, was produced by Jane Schoenbrun and premiered at the Fantasia International Film Festival on 18 July 2026.

== Methods, influences and style ==
Mackay's works are crowdfunded and do not rely on government funding. She insists on working with a "predominantly queer and gender-diverse cast and crew" for all her films. Mackay has stated she dislikes social media and is "vehemently" opposed to the use of AI in film, adding that she "(hates) every aspect of it in every industry." She has also stated that she "doesn't consume a lot of Australian media" and that most of her success has come from the United States while "the support from Australia... has never really been there." Two of her most-frequently cited influences include Gregg Araki and John Waters.

== Selected works ==
Key
†	Denotes films that have not yet been released

Year	Title	Director	Writer	Producer	Actor	Notes
2017	Book Club	Yes	Yes	Yes	Yes	Web series, 2 episodes
2018	Bestia	Yes	Yes	No	No	Short film
2019	Smothered	Yes	Yes	Yes	No	Short film, also cinematographer and editor
2019	A Tale of the Laundry Game	Yes	Yes	No	No	Short film. Based on a short story by Stephen King.
2019	Love and Blood	Yes	Yes	Yes	No	Short film
2020	Tooth 4 Tooth	Yes	Yes	Yes	No	Short film
2021	The Serpent's Nest	Yes	Yes	Yes	No	Short film
2021	So Vam	Yes	Yes	Yes	No	
2022	Bad Girl Boogey	Yes	Yes	Yes	No	
2022	It Listens from the Radio	No	Yes	No	No	Podcast, 1 episode
2022	Howl of the Werewolf	Yes	Yes	Yes	No	Short film. Based on a short story by Ed Wood.
2023	T Blockers	Yes	Yes	Yes	No	
2023	Satranic Panic	Yes	Yes	Yes	No	
2024	Carnage for Christmas	Yes	Yes	Yes	No	
2024	Castration Movie	No	No	No	Yes	
2025	The Serpent's Skin	Yes	Yes	Yes	No	
2026	Our Effed Up World	Yes	Yes	Yes	No	

== Awards and nominations ==
Year	Award	Category	Nominated work	Result	Ref.
2020	Los Angeles Film Awards	Best Young Filmmaker	Tooth 4 Tooth	Won	
2023	Popcorn Frights Film Festival	Best Feature Film	T Blockers	Nominated (Note: Shared with Erin Paterson.)	
2023	L.A. Outfest	Special Programming Award for Emerging Talent	T Blockers	Won	
