= Bisexual lighting =

Pink, purple, and blue lighting

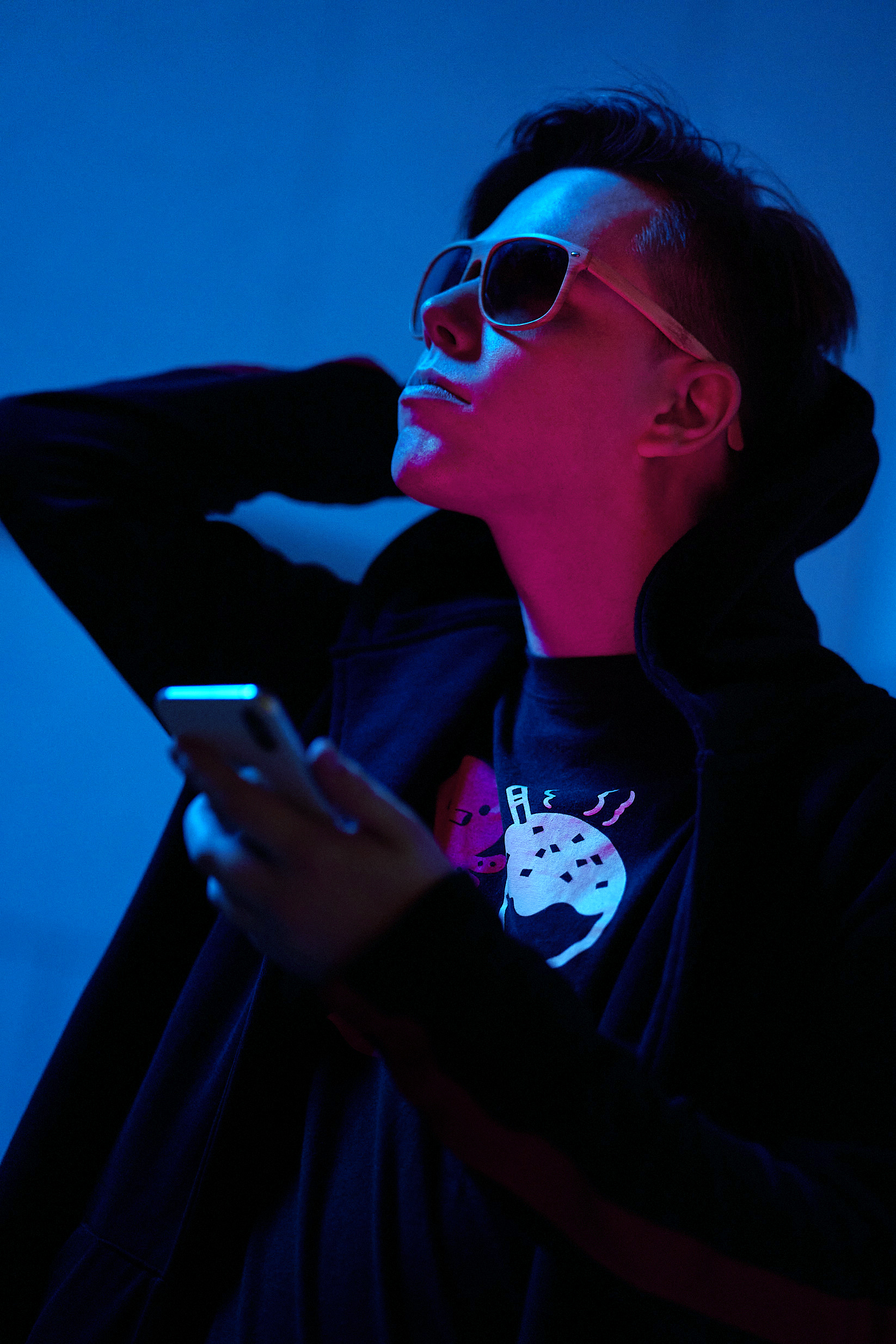
A person lit with pink light from one angle and blue from another

Bisexual lighting is the simultaneous use of pink, purple, and blue lighting and is sometimes used to represent bisexual characters. It has been used in studio lighting for film and television, and has been observed in the cinematography of various films. While not all films, television shows, photographs, and music videos that use this lighting intend to portray bisexuality, many queer artists have deliberately used this color palette—which resembles that of the bisexual flag—in their work.

It is reminiscent of neon lights and is also associated with retrowave.

== Symbolism ==
The bisexual pride flag, which uses pink, purple, and blue colors

George Pierpoint of BBC News writes that some social media users claim bisexual lighting has been used as an "empowering visual device" which counteracts perceived under-representation of bisexuality in the visual media. The colors may be a direct reference to the bisexual pride flag. The trend gained traction in the LGBTQ community in 2017 particularly on social media sites Twitter, Reddit, and Pinterest. Sasha Geffen wrote at Vulture.com that it had become "solid in its meaning", while Nicky Idika of PopBuzz wrote that it has now "become an established part of bisexual storytelling in media". And while The Daily Dot questioned whether "the aesthetic or the cultural significance [came] first", it too concluded that the idea "has stuck". Pantone selected "Ultra Violet" as the color of 2018 in a move the BBC says reflected the growing use of the scheme.

Amelia Perrin has criticized the trend of using such lighting when bisexual characters appear in television and music videos, arguing in Cosmopolitan that this visual image "perpetuates bisexual stereotypes". Perrin argues that this kind of lighting is usually produced by neon lights, which suggest "clubs and dancefloors" to the viewer, and this implies that "bisexual hook-ups and relationships are merely 'experiments', and something that only happens when you're drunk on a night out."

According to Jessica Mason of The Mary Sue, the color purple—being a combination of multiple pure, spectral colors—has historically been used to represent "royalty and the divine," as well as "magic, aliens and the unknown." Film lecturer Lara Thompson saw the neon shades of pink and blue as part of a nostalgic trend for 1980s and 1990s aesthetics in media of the late 2010s.

== History ==
According to BOWIE Creators, the concept of bisexual lighting was invented in 2014 by a Tumblr fan of Sherlock who believed that the lighting was being used to signal that Dr. Watson was bisexual and would eventually be in a romantic relationship with Sherlock Holmes. This brief suggestion of bisexual lighting had no direct impact on other shows, movies, or music videos containing it, but it did put the idea into the world that bisexual themes could be expressed via this color scheme. Around 2017, some YouTubers such as ContraPoints (who identified as bisexual at the time) began to light their videos with pink, purple, and blue neon lights. The use of bisexual lighting became a popular meme in 2018, with multiple Twitter threads showcasing instances of the lighting scheme going viral, as well as photographs of animals in bisexual lighting being shared widely on social media.

== Examples ==
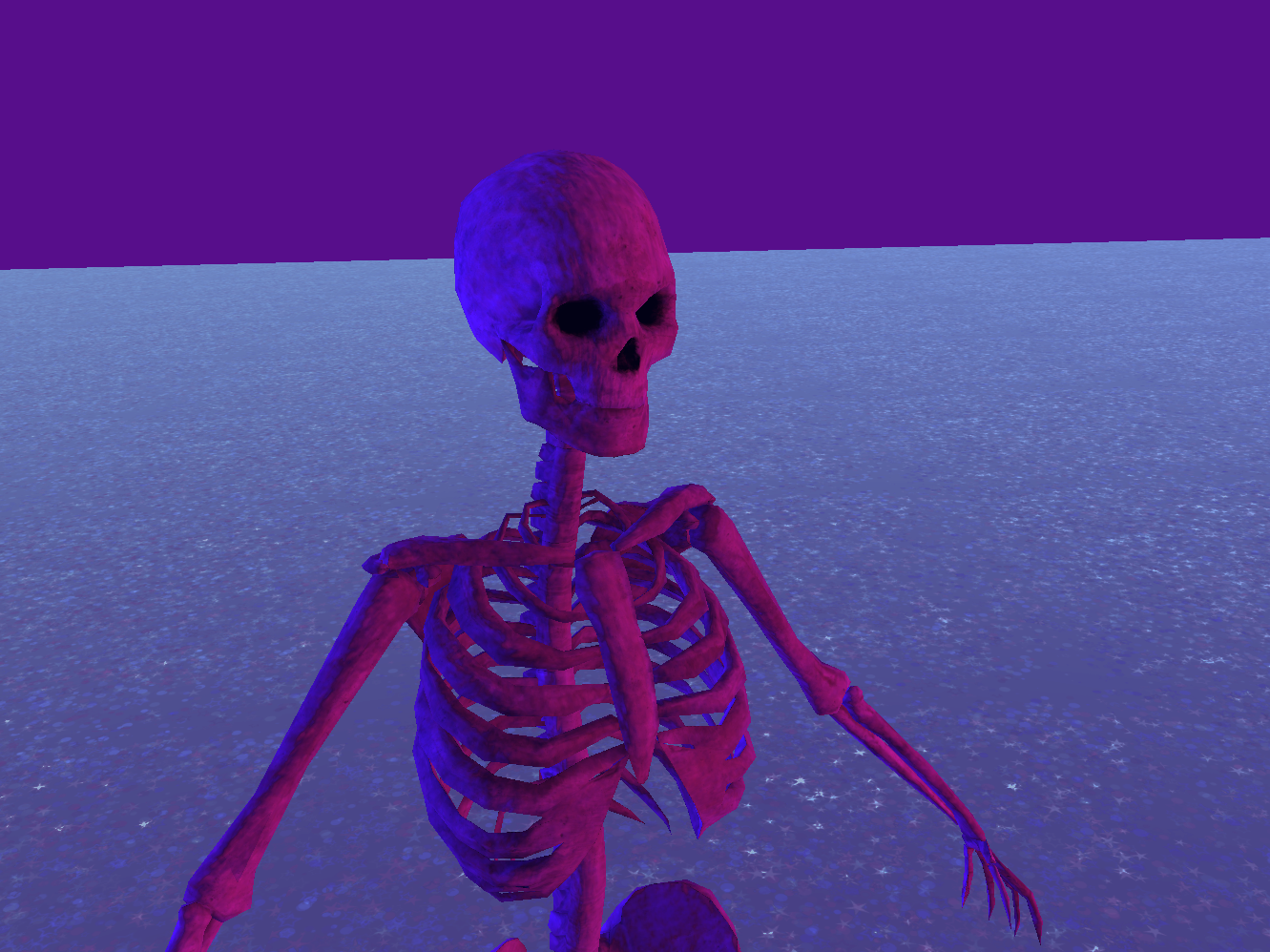
A 3D rendering of a skeleton showcasing bisexual lighting

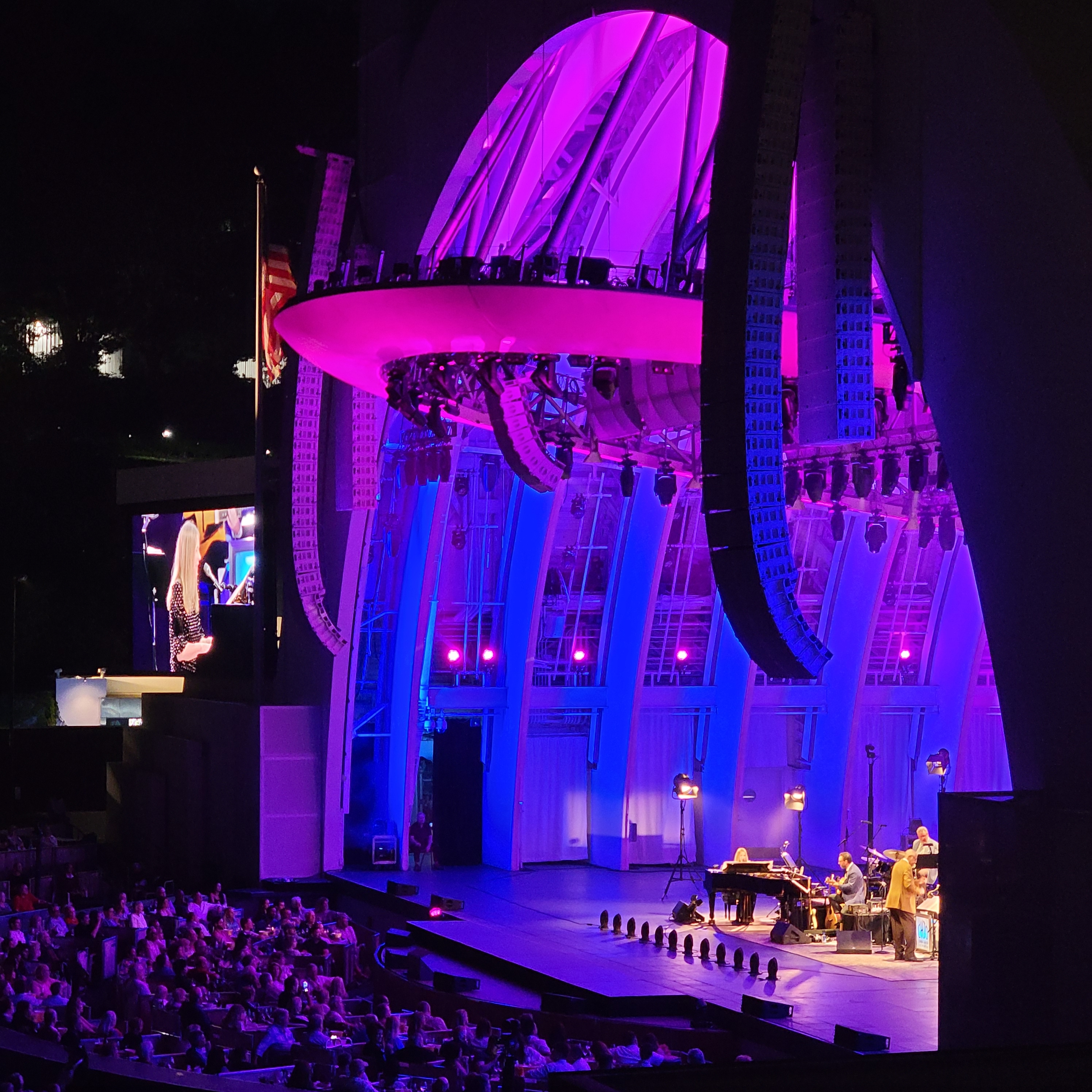
The Hollywood Bowl utilized bisexual lighting during a 2023 performance by Diana Krall where she sang a love song in which the subject is a woman.

Bisexual lighting appears across mediums, often in scenes featuring bisexual characters or referencing bisexuality. The films The Neon Demon, Atomic Blonde, and Black Panther all feature the use of blue, pink, and purple lighting. Similarly, the award-winning Black Mirror episode "San Junipero", as well as episodes from Blumhouse holiday horror anthology Into the Dark, including "I'm Just F*cking with You", "Midnight Kiss", and "My Valentine" made use of the visual aesthetic. Later, the television series Riverdale, Moonbeam City, The Assassination of Gianni Versace: American Crime Story, Voltron: Legendary Defender, and The Owl House, as well as the 2020 film Birds of Prey, were also stated to be using it. The third episode of Loki, "Lamentis", features this lighting in a scene where the title character discloses his bisexuality.

Bisexual lighting also features in the music videos of Janelle Monáe's "Make Me Feel," Demi Lovato's "Cool for the Summer," and Ariana Grande's "7 Rings." The term was used to describe the "electric blue and magenta pink lights" that flash during Harry Styles' song "Medicine" when he plays it on tour and in Lil Nas X's music video for "Panini". Cosmopolitan noted that some of Taylor Swift's fans cited the color palette's presence on her album cover for Lover as evidence for their long-refuted fan theories that she is bisexual and at one point dated Karlie Kloss. Jimin from BTS went viral in 2022 for his self-produced photofolio under this concept.

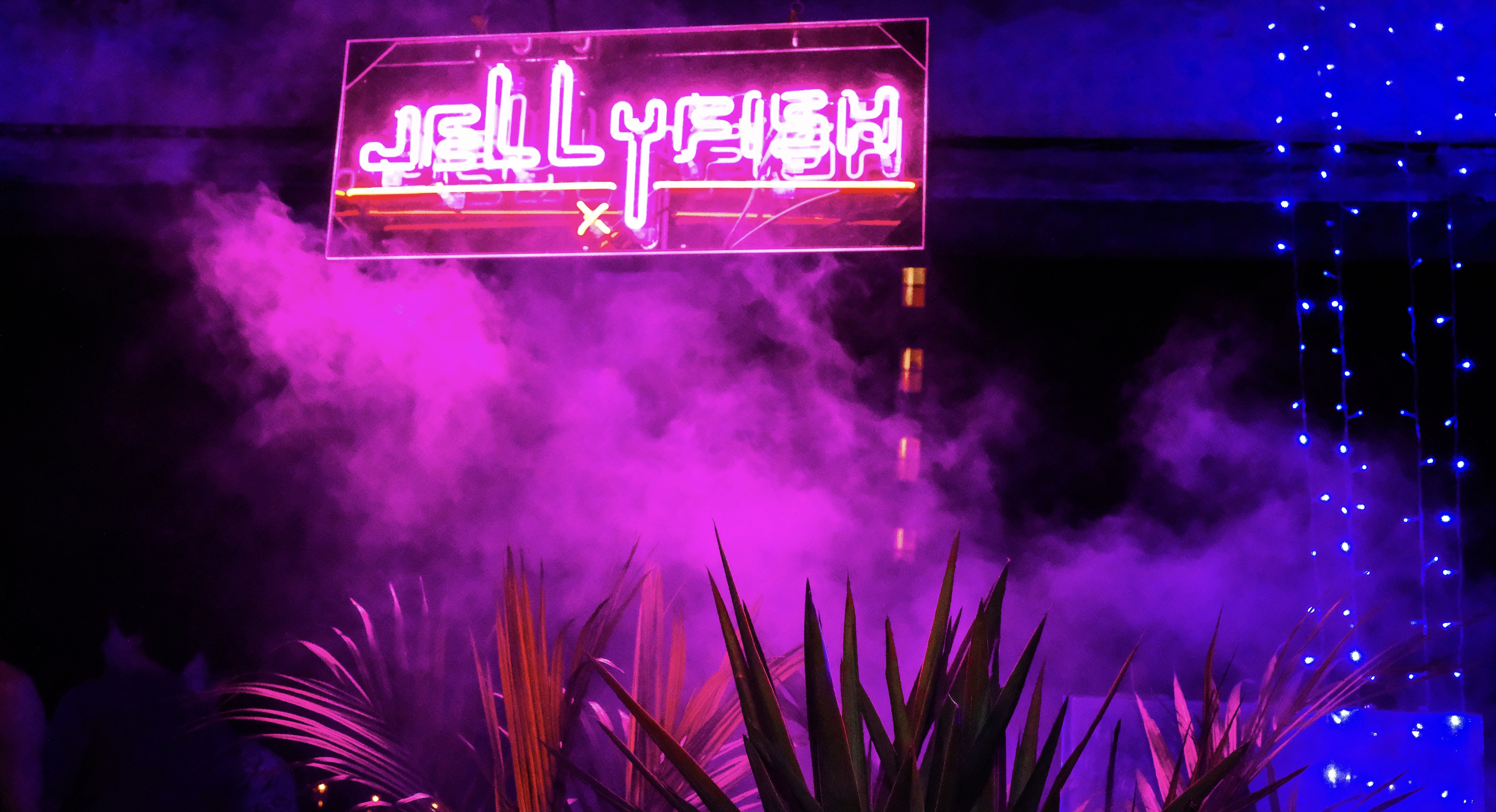
A dance party showcasing bisexual lighting

Lara Thompson, a lecturer of film at Middlesex University, has argued that bisexual lighting is not well-known, stating: "I would have to see more examples before I see bisexual lighting as a wholly convincing phenomenon". According to Lillian Hochwender writing in Polygon, "Bi lighting often feels ubiquitous, even when there isn't a hint of bisexuality in sight [...] These are the colors of magic in fantasy, alien landscapes in sci-fi, and the neon lighting of cyberpunk settings and nightclubs. Thus, while Twitter users and media critics have noted bi lighting in John Wick 3, Blade Runner 2049, Color Out of Space, Orphan: First Kill, Bingo Hell, Men in Black: International, Bullet Train and Spider-Man: Into the Spider-Verse, there's often a less gay logic for doing so."

In 2022, bisexual lighting was noticed in Netflix's Heartstopper and HBO's Emmy Award-winning Euphoria. The 2022 bisexual leather film, Please Baby Please, employed bisexual lighting throughout the entire film.

== See also ==
- Peak TV
- Vaporwave
- Synthwave
