= Alan Noble (entrepreneur) =

Australian engineer and entrepreneur

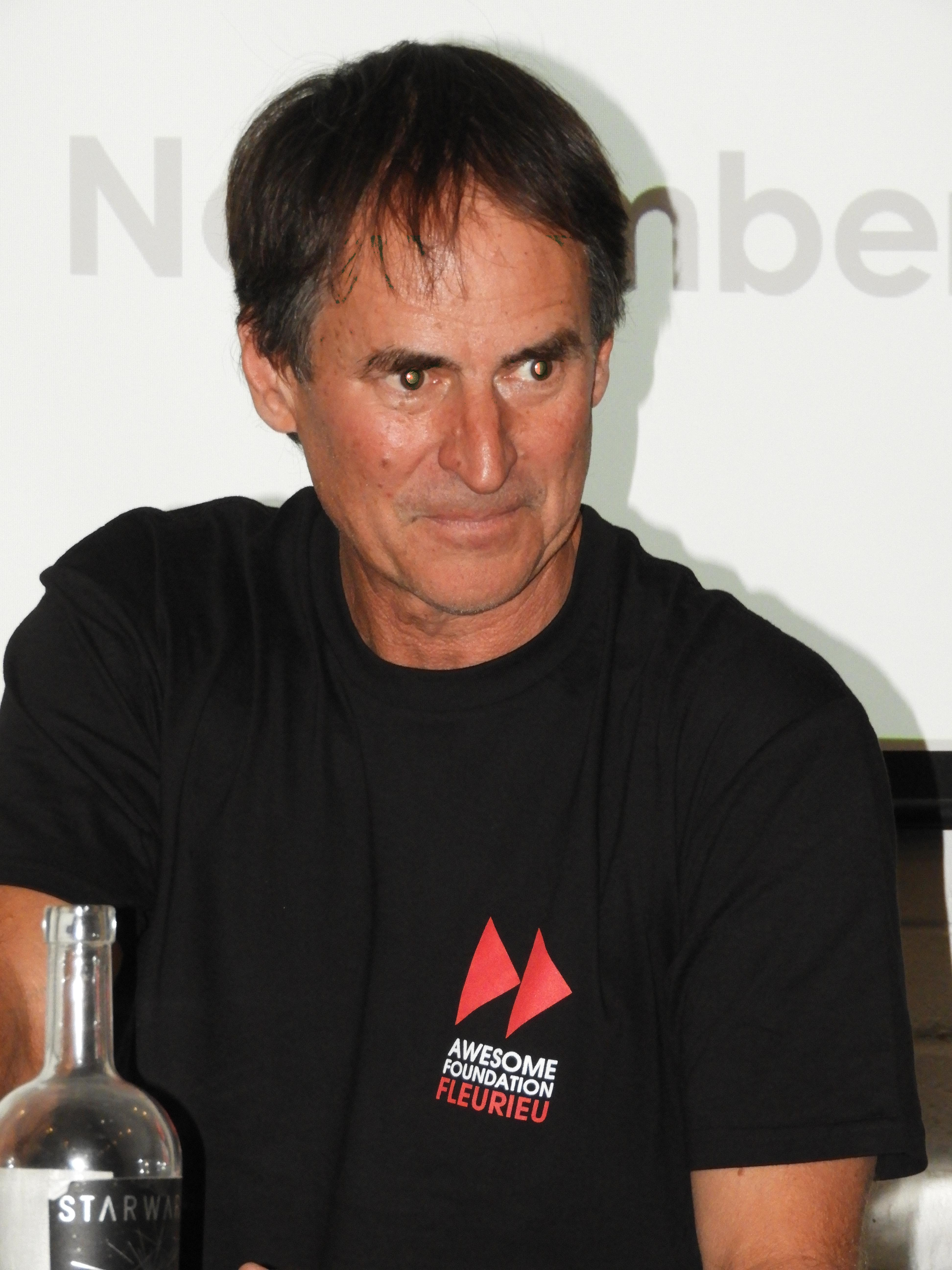
Alan Noble, entrepreneur (2018)

Alan Charles Noble is an Australian engineer, technology entrepreneur and founder of the not-for-profit marine conservation organisation, AusOcean.

== Career ==
Noble studied at the University of Adelaide and Stanford University where he obtained a Bachelor of Electronic and Electrical Engineering and a Master of Computer Science Artificial Intelligence respectively.

He worked in established and startup technology companies in Japan, Silicon Valley and Australia. Some of his start-up technology ventures lead to acquisitions by Nokia and Riverbed Technologies.

In 2007, Noble joined Google Australia, and in 2008 he was appointed as an adjunct professor at the University of Adelaide.

Since the late 2000s, Noble has acted as an advisor to the Australian government, including for the Chief Scientist of Australia, the Australian Information Commissioner and the Government 2.0 Taskforce.

In 2013, Noble founded StartupAUS, following on from his experience with the angel investment group SA Angels (2007-2014). In 2014, he appeared in Episode 1 of That Startup Show.

In 2014, Noble was appointed as a director of the board of the South Australian Museum.

In 2016, the Kangaroo Island Wilderness Trail was surveyed by Google Street View Trekker under Alan Noble's lead. Noble also bought property on Kangaroo Island that year. Meanwhile, his property at Willunga became the first residential customer of Redflow's ZCell off-grid energy storage system.

=== AusOcean ===
In 2017, he established the not-for-profit organisation AusOcean with marine scientist, Professor Sean Connell with the objective of lowering the cost of long-term marine environmental monitoring. In 2018, AusOcean's Network Blue sensor rigs received approval to be deployed in the Port River in South Australia. Immanuel College in Adelaide is one of Network Blue's partners.

Noble resigned from his position as head of engineering at Google Australia in 2018 to focus on AusOcean. AusOcean undertook underwater survey work in Smith Bay, Kangaroo Island in December 2018 and February 2019.

=== The Koala Sanctuary ===
In 2024, along with Prof. Karen Burke da Silva and Dr. Julian Beaman, he co-founded The Koala Sanctuary on Kangaroo Island, with the mission of safeguarding koalas and their habitats through conservation, education and research.

== Early life ==
Noble grew up in Warradale, South Australia and attended Brighton Primary School and Brighton Secondary School. After university, he lived briefly in the Netherlands before moving to Japan in August 1983. In September 1986, he moved to California, where he lived for sixteen years until returning to Australia in 2002.
