= Classroom (Apple) =

iPad app for education use

Classroom for iPadOS

- The Classroom app running on an iPad
- Developer: Apple Inc.
- Release: March 21, 2016
- Operating system: iPadOS
- Available in: 34 languages
- List of languages English, Arabic, Catalan, Chinese (Hong Kong), Croatian, Czech, Danish, Dutch, Finnish, French, German, Greek, Hebrew, Hindi, Hungarian, Indonesian, Italian, Japanese, Korean, Malay, Norwegian, Polish, Portuguese, Romanian, Russian, Simplified Chinese, Slovak, Spanish, Swedish, Thai, Traditional Chinese, Turkish, Ukrainian, Vietnamese
- Type: Remote administration
- License: Proprietary
- Website: apple.com/education/teaching-tools

Classroom is an iPadOS app, developed by Apple Inc., which allows teachers to view, remote control, and transfer files to students in their classes. The app allows teachers to assign activities to students.

== Schoolwork ==
Schoolwork for iPadOS

- The Schoolwork app running on an iPad
- Developer: Apple Inc.
- Release: June 26, 2018; 8 years ago
- Operating system: iPadOS
- Available in: 32 languages
- List of languages English, Catalan, Chinese (Hong Kong), Croatian, Czech, Danish, Dutch, Finnish, French, German, Greek, Hindi, Hungarian, Indonesian, Italian, Japanese, Korean, Malay, Norwegian, Polish, Portuguese, Romanian, Russian, Simplified Chinese, Slovak, Spanish, Swedish, Thai, Traditional Chinese, Turkish, Ukrainian, Vietnamese
- Type: Learning management systems
- License: Proprietary
- Website: Official website Download link

Schoolwork is a companion app for Classroom, announced during Apple's edtech event in March 2018 and released in June 2018. The free app allows teachers to distribute documents, iBook files, web links, and assignments through ClassKit (such as Kahoot! quizzes) with due dates. Students can hand-in those assignments via the app for teachers to view and provide feedback via the app.

The app allows teachers to view what students are doing on their screen. ClassKit allows developers of educational apps to create links for specific function in their application, which teachers can subsequently assign to students. It also relays the results of the student's actions back to the Schoolwork app to be shared with the teacher.

== See also ==
- Google Classroom
