= CyberHound =

Australian internet provider

CyberHound Pty Ltd
- Formerly: Netbox Blue
- Type: Privately held company
- Traded as: ASX: SLC
- Industry: Network security
- Founded: 1999
- Founders: John Oxnam; Justin Cook; Trent Davis
- Headquarters: Brisbane, Queensland, Australia
- Key people: John Fison (CEO); Adam Smith (CTO); Stephen Walsh (Director of Customer Services); Ellen Pickett (Director of Finance)
- Products: 6S Technology; Next Generation Firewall; Secure Web Gateway and Proxy; Unified Threat Management; Endpoint Management; URL Web Filtering; Load Balancing and Link Failover; Identity Management; Internet Acceleration
- Number of employees: 35 (2018)
- Parent: Superloop Group (ASX: SLC)
- Website: cyberhound.com

Cyberhound Pty Ltd (formerly Netbox Blue Pty Ltd, as of November 2015), is an Australian-owned provider of internet and email security, filtering and management solutions founded in Brisbane by John Oxnam, Justin Cook and Trent Davis in 1999. It is a privately held company. CyberHound's head office is located in Fortitude Valley, Queensland, Australia. The company provides products for internet compliance, management and security.

== History ==
John Fison became chairman of Netbox Blue in 2006 and is a director and shareholder in the company. In January 2016, Bloomberg acquired some IP and assets of Netbox Blue for Bloomberg Vault to monitor social media. Trent Davis now works for Bloomberg.

== Platform ==
In 2008 Netbox Blue launched an internet and email filtering appliance specifically for the education sector. The technology offers cyberbullying protection, category web filtering, spam filtering, virus protection, internet quota management and a firewall.

== Partnerships ==
- IBM

In late 2006 Netbox Blue partnered with the IT corporation IBM.

- Canon ITS Japan

In April 2008 Global IT vendor Canon IT Solutions (ITS) Japan signed a distribution agreement with Netbox Blue. Netbox Blue agreed to provide its SpamChecker appliance—as it is known in Japan—to Canon ITS Japan's customers for email filtering and content control. The drop-in appliance was the result of nine months of co-development between Netbox Blue and Canon Japan and is specifically designed for the SME market in Japan.

- ESET

Netbox Blue partnered with anti-virus software provider ESET. The partnership offered customers ESET NOD32 Antivirus as an option in Netbox Blue's line of UTM and virtualised security products. As a result of the union, small- to medium-sized businesses (SMBs) also have access to Netbox Blue's integrated security and management suite.

- EdgeWave USA

In June 2012 Netbox Blue partnered with EdgeWave, Inc. The deal enables EdgeWave to provide its customers with Netbox Blue's social media management technology SafeChat.
