= So Vam =

2021 Australian horror film

- Film poster
- Directed by: Alice Maio Mackay
- Written by: Alice Maio Mackay; Benjamin Pahl Robinson
- Produced by: Alice Maio Mackay; Ben Yennie
- Starring: Xai; Grace Hyland; Tumelo Nthupi; Chris Asimos; Erin Paterson
- Cinematography: Aaron Schuppan
- Edited by: Daniel Vink
- Music by: Alexander Taylor
- Distributed by: Mutiny Pictures
- Release date: 2021
- Running time: 73 minutes
- Country: Australia
- Language: English
- Budget: $12,000

So Vam is a 2021 Australian horror film directed by Alice Maio Mackay, and co-written by Alice Maio Mackay and Benjamin Pahl Robinson. It stars Xai, Grace Hyland, Tumelo Nthupi, Chris Asimos, and Erin Paterson. The film's cast also includes drag performers BenDeLaCreme and Etcetera Etcetera.

Its plot features Kurt (Xai), a bullied teen who dreams of moving from his conservative town to become a famous drag queen in the city. After falling victim to a predatory vampire (Asimos), he joins a coven of queer vampires who feed on bigots. The film blends elements of the supernatural, horror, and coming-of-age genres.

== Cast ==
- Xai as Kurt
- Grace Hyland as April
- Tumelo Nthupi as Andy
- Chris Asimos as Landon
- Erin Paterson as Katie
- Iris Mcerlean as Harley
- Molly Ferguson as Luanne
- Hallie Chlanda as Maddie
- Em Bleby as Carly (as Emma Bleby)
- Brendan Cooney as Kurt's Dad
- Luana Pohe as Layla
- Vonni as Dolly
- Alixxx as Chic
- Etcetera Etcetera as Fortune Teller
- Benjamin Putnam as Famous Drag Queen (voice) (as BenDeLaCreme)

== Production ==
Mackay claims that the idea for So Vam came from her desire to create a "diverse and authentic/unique horror film" that included vampires, drag, trans leads, and a camp sensibility. She also cites The Craft: Legacy and Black Christmas (2019) as influences for So Vam.

Mackay shot the film when she was 16 years old and had just dropped out of school. Shooting occurred over seven days in the summer, with production wrapping in mid-January 2021. It is Mackay's debut feature film.

== Release ==
So Vam held its world premiere at the Salem Horror Fest on October 9, 2021. The film was distributed by Mutiny Pictures and was released digitally on August 25, 2022 via the video streaming service Shudder.

== Reception ==
So Vam has garnered positive reviews. Matt Donato of Paste rated it 6 out of 10. He critiques some of the technical aspects of the film–attributing these shortcomings to Mackay's lack of experience–while praising its vision and narrative components. He states, "Its technical motions are janky and unpolished, but that doesn't discredit Mackay's stronger voice as a storyteller and scene composer. So Vam is a tale of intent versus execution, masking low-budget gumption with passionate narrations."

Saul Muerte of Surgeons of Horror expressed similar views, praising its LGBTQ+ themes despite low budget limitations. He states, "Director Mackay paints a perfect metaphor for transitions and change for a community trapped by their identity through the tale of vampire mythology. Despite its limitations, there is measure to be had here and a narrative that has been crafted with a learned voice."

Jennifer Bonges of PopHorror lauded the film, celebrating its performances and technical aspects. She writes, "So Vam didn't disappoint me in any way! I loved every minute of it."

Deirdre Crimmins of Rue Morgue said that despite the film "(suffering) from some common mishaps that plague both first features and low-budget horror... there is something exciting and interesting at the core of So Vam: an honest and refreshing affection for outsiders of the queer and/or monstrous varieties."
