= Dark Star Pictures =

North American film distributor

- Industry: Motion picture
- Genre: Independent; International
- Founded: 2018; 8 years ago
- Founder: Michael Repsch
- Headquarters: Los Angeles, California, United States
- Website: darkstarpics.com

Dark Star Pictures is an American independent film distribution company founded in 2017 by film executive and producer Michael Repsch. The company specializes in the North American distribution of auteur-driven independent films, with a particular focus on genre cinema and millennial audiences.

== History ==
Dark Star Pictures was launched at the American Film Market (AFM) in 2017 by Michael Repsch. The company was established to acquire and distribute independent films for theatrical, digital, and festival release in North America. Dark Star’s initial slate included Entanglement, Gutland, All You Can Eat Buddha, and The Queen of Hollywood Blvd, with scheduled releases across film festivals, theaters, and digital platforms in 2018.

In January 2021, Dark Star Pictures and horror entertainment platform Bloody Disgusting announced the formation of a joint distribution label focused on genre films. To mark the collaboration, the two companies organized a virtual film festival from January 22 to 24, 2021, which showcased a curated selection of horror titles, including Koko-Di Koko-Da, PVT Chat, Jumbo, Dirty God and Climate of the Hunter. The first theatrical release under the joint label was horror-thriller HoneyDrew.

In 2022, Dark Star Pictures was profiled in GLAAD’s Studio Responsibility Index (SRI) report alongside other independent North American distributors. The report highlighted the company's focus on acquiring and distributing LGBTQ-inclusive films, including the GLAAD Media Award-nominated Tu Me Manques and The Astronaut Lovers.

In 2023, Dark Star Pictures partnered with Mantícora Distribution (Mexico) and La Dalia Films (Spain) to launch Antídoto Horror Factory, a genre-focused label aimed at developing and distributing independent horror films across North America, Latin America, and Spain. The venture plans to produce a minimum of four films over four years.
