= LGBTQ community =

Community and culture of lesbian, gay, bisexual and transgender people

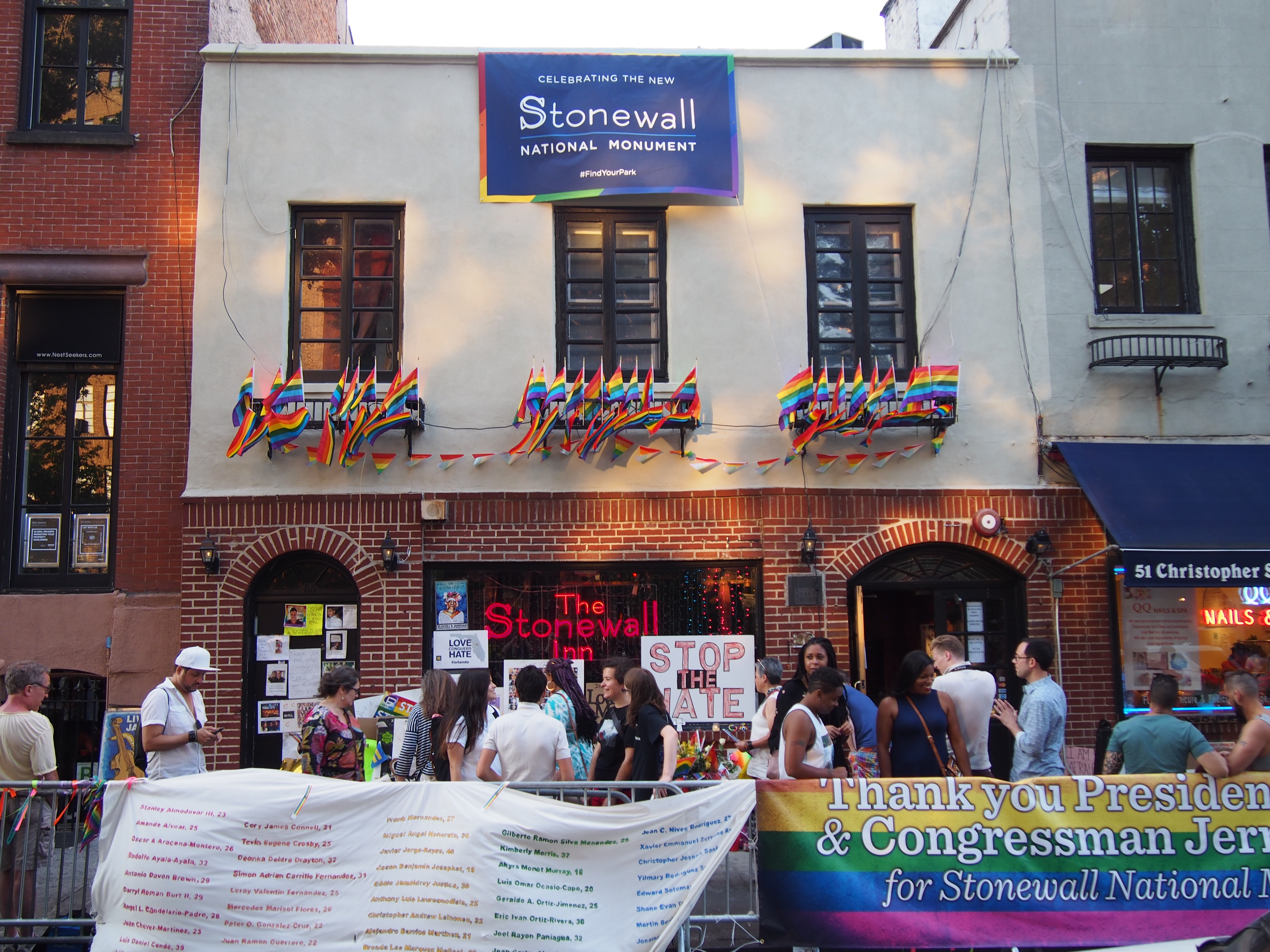
Greenwich Village, a gay neighborhood in Manhattan, is home to the Stonewall Inn, shown here adorned with rainbow pride flags.

The LGBTQ community or queer community (also known by variants of the initialism LGBTQ) (Note: Other variants include: LGBT, LGBT+, LGBTQ+, LGBTQIA, LGBTQIA+, 2SLGBTQ, 2SLGBTQ+, GLBT, GLBTQ, LGBTQQ, LGBTI, LGBTI+) comprises LGBTQ individuals united by a common culture and social movements. These communities generally celebrate pride, diversity, individuality, and sexuality. LGBTQ rights activists and sociologists see LGBTQ community-building as a counterweight to heterosexism, homophobia, biphobia, transphobia, sexualism, and conformist pressures that exist in the larger society.

The term pride or sometimes gay pride expresses the LGBTQ community's identity and collective strength; pride parades provide both a prime example of the use and a demonstration of the general meaning of the term. The LGBTQ community is diverse in political affiliation. Not all LGBTQ people consider themselves part of the LGBTQ community.

Groups that may be considered part of the LGBTQ community include gay villages, LGBTQ rights organizations, LGBTQ employee groups at companies, LGBTQ student groups in schools and universities, and LGBTQ-affirming religious groups.

LGBTQ communities may organize themselves into, or support, movements for civil rights promoting LGBTQ rights in various places around the world. At the same time, high-profile celebrities in the broader society may offer strong support to these organizations in certain locations; for example, LGBTQ advocate and entertainer Madonna stated, "I was asked to perform at many Pride events around the world — but I would never, ever turn down New York City".

== Terminology ==
LGBTQ is an initialism that stands for lesbian, gay, bisexual, transgender, and queer that is often used as an umbrella term for all sexual and gender minorities.

The first widely used term, homosexual, began being replaced by gay in the 1970s, and then increasingly by “gay and lesbian.” In the 1990s, the initialism GLBT (later LGBT) was gradually adopted, as bisexual and transgender people gained recognition. At the same time, some activists began to reclaim the term queer as a more radical and inclusive umbrella term, though others rejected it due to its history as a pejorative. In recognition of this, the 2010s saw the adoption of LGBTQ and other more inclusive variants.

These labels are not universally agreed upon by everyone that they are intended to include. For example, some intersex people prefer to be included in this grouping, while others do not. Various alternative umbrella terms exist across various cultures, including queer; same-gender loving (SGL); and gender, sexual and romantic minorities (GSRM).

Many further variants exist which add additional identities, such as 2SLGBTQ (for two-spirit), LGBTQQ (for queer and questioning), and LGBTQIA (for intersex and asexual). Some versions of the term add a plus sign (+) to represent additional identities not captured by the letters within the initialism or replace some of BTQ with a plus sign.

== Symbols ==
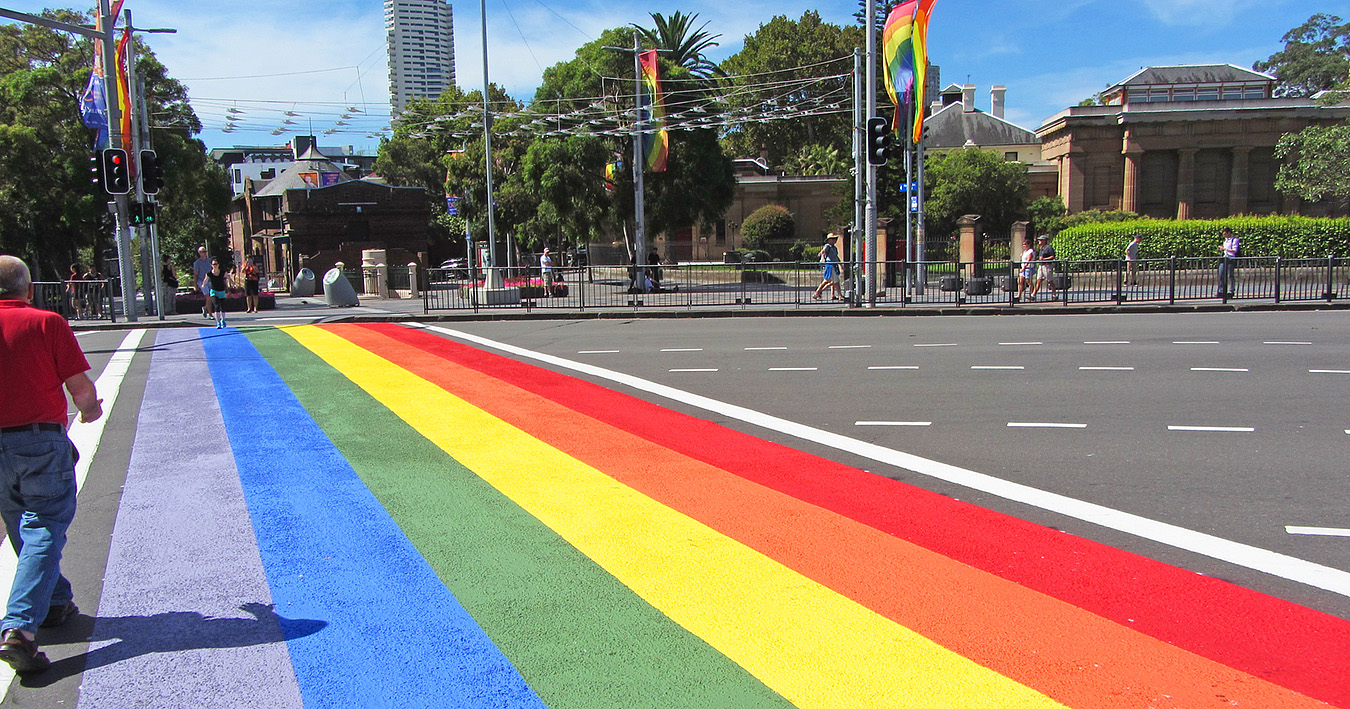
The first temporary Rainbow Crossing in Australia on Oxford Street in Sydney's "gayborhood" of Darlinghurst. It was first installed in February 2013 for the Sydney Gay and Lesbian Mardi Gras and then removed in April 2013.

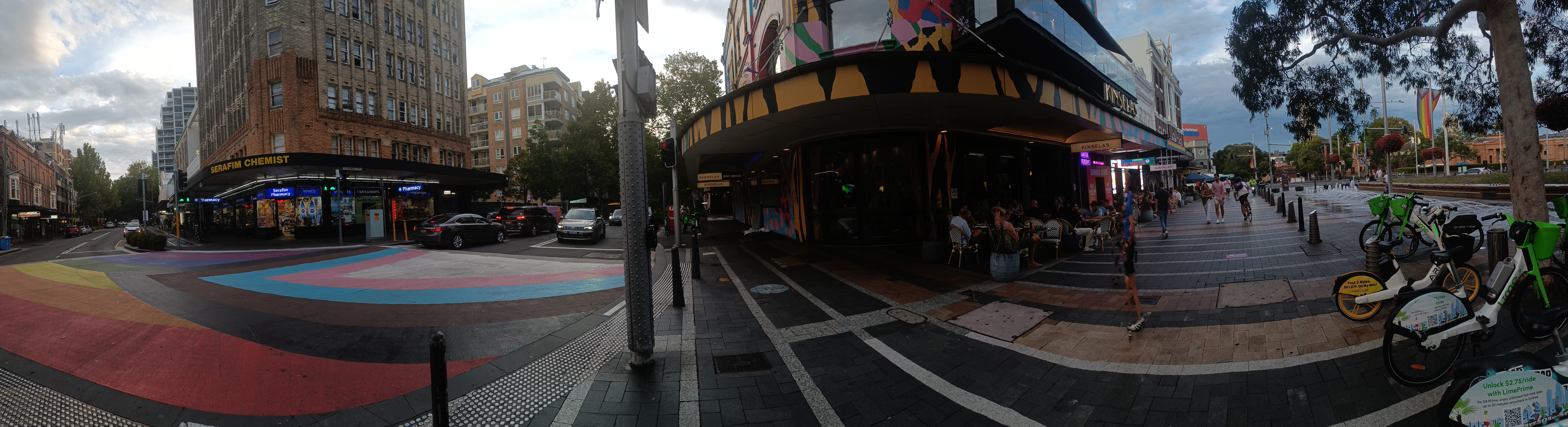
A new rainbow crossing was installed in 2019, and was updated in 2024 to include the progress pride flag. The new crossing sits on the border between Surry Hills and Darlinghurst.

The gay community is frequently associated with certain symbols, especially the rainbow or rainbow flags. The Greek lambda symbol ("L" for liberation), triangles, ribbons, and gender symbols are also used as "gay acceptance" symbol. There are many types of flags to represent subdivisions in the gay community, but the most commonly recognized one is the rainbow flag. According to Gilbert Baker, creator of the commonly known rainbow flag, each color represents a value in the community:

- pink = sexuality
- red = life
- orange = healing
- yellow = the sun
- green = nature
- blue = art
- indigo = harmony
- violet = spirit

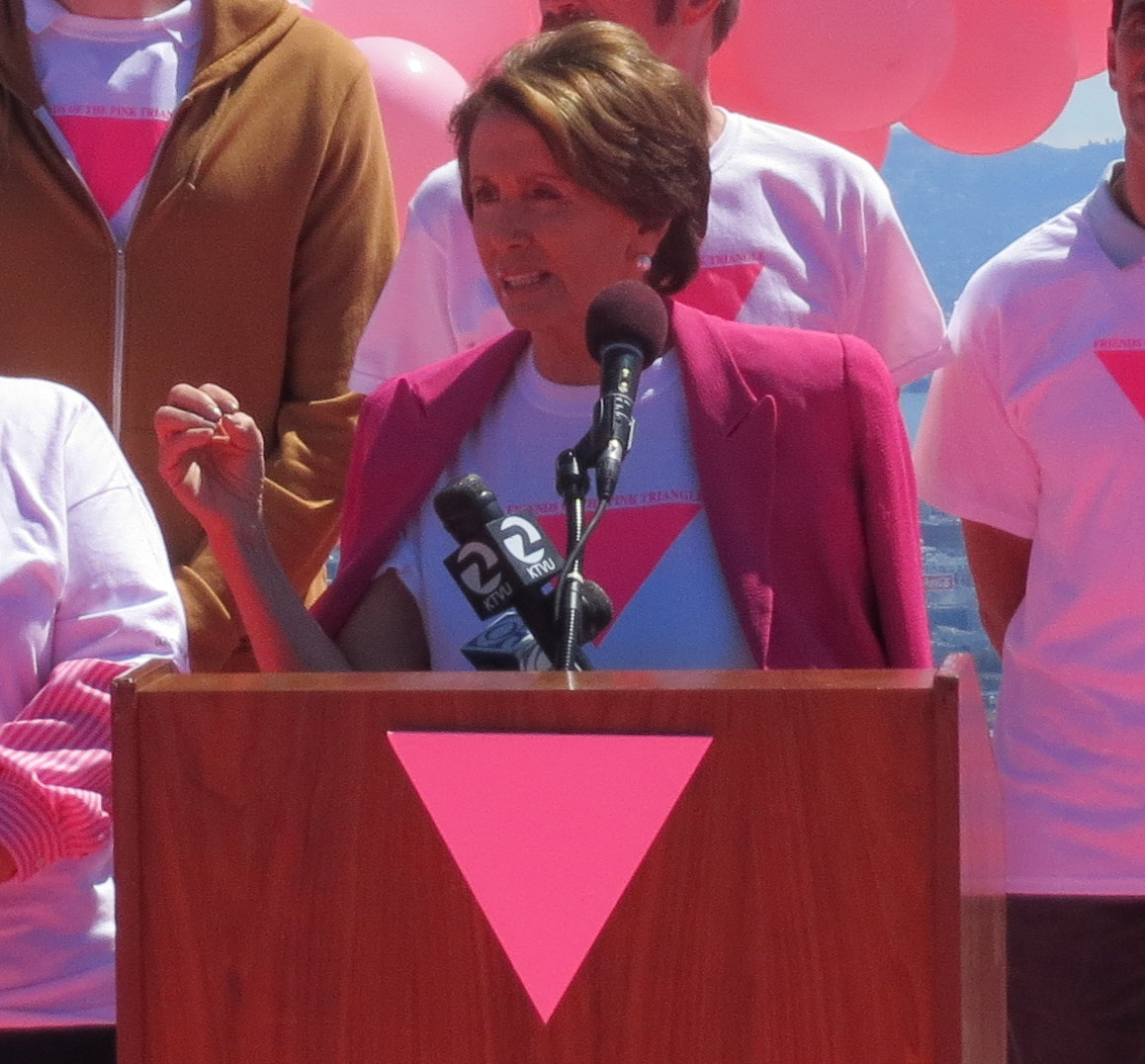
Congresswoman Nancy Pelosi at the Friends of the Pink Triangle Ceremony

Later, pink and indigo were removed from the flag, resulting in the present-day flag which was first presented at the 1979 Pride Parade. Other flags include the Victory over AIDS flag, the Leather Pride flag, and the Bear Pride flag.

The lambda symbol was originally adopted by Gay Activists Alliance of New York in 1970 after they broke away from the larger Gay Liberation Front. Lambda was chosen because people might confuse it for a college symbol and not recognize it as a gay community symbol unless one was actually involved in the community. "Back in December of 1974, the lambda was officially declared the international symbol for gay and lesbian rights by the International Gay Rights Congress in Edinburgh, Scotland."

The triangle became a symbol for the gay community after the Holocaust. Not only did it represent Jews, but homosexuals who were killed because of German law. During the Holocaust, homosexuals were labeled with pink triangles to distinguish between them, Jews, regular prisoners, and political prisoners. The black triangle is similarly a symbol for females only to represent lesbian sisterhood.

Pink and yellow triangles were utilized to label Jewish homosexuals during the Holocaust.

The pink and yellow triangle was used to label Jewish homosexuals. Gender symbols have a much longer list of variations of homosexual or bisexual relationships which are clearly recognizable but may not be as popularly seen as the other symbols. Other symbols that relate to the gay community or gay pride include the gay-teen suicide awareness ribbon, AIDS awareness ribbon, labrys, and purple rhinoceros.

In the fall of 1995, the Human Rights Campaign adopted a logo (yellow equal sign on deep blue square) that has become one of the most recognizable symbols of the lesbian, gay, bisexual and transgender community. The logo can be spotted the world over and has become synonymous with the fight for equal rights for LGBTQ people.

One of the most notable recent changes was made in Philadelphia, Pennsylvania, on June 8, 2017. They added two new stripes to the rainbow flag, one black and one brown. These were intended to highlight members of color within the LGBTQ community.

=== LGBTQIA+ Pride flags ===
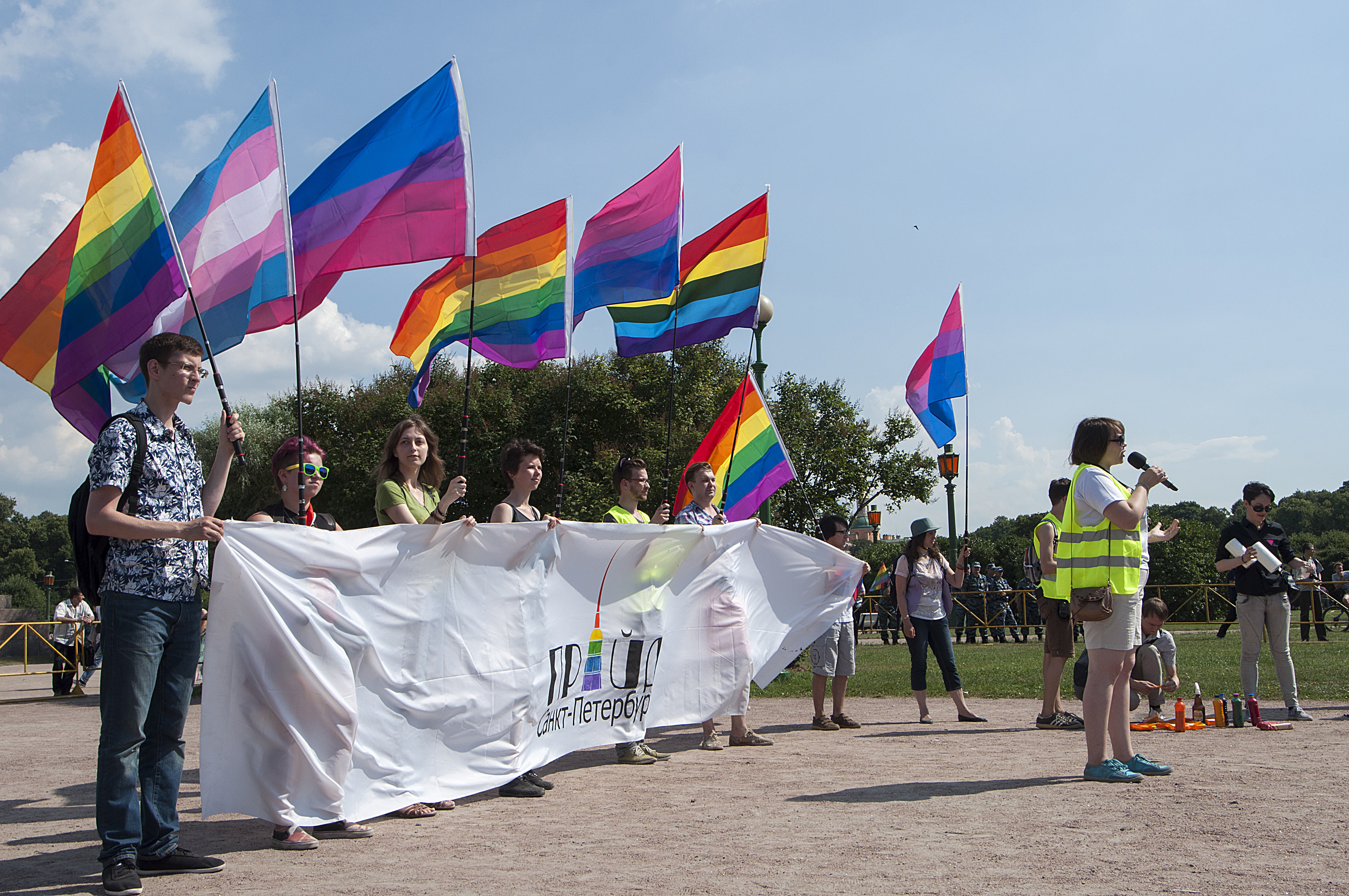
LGBTQIA+ Pride flags at a rally for the fifth St. Petersburg Gay Pride, held in the Field of Mars, Saint Petersburg, 2014.

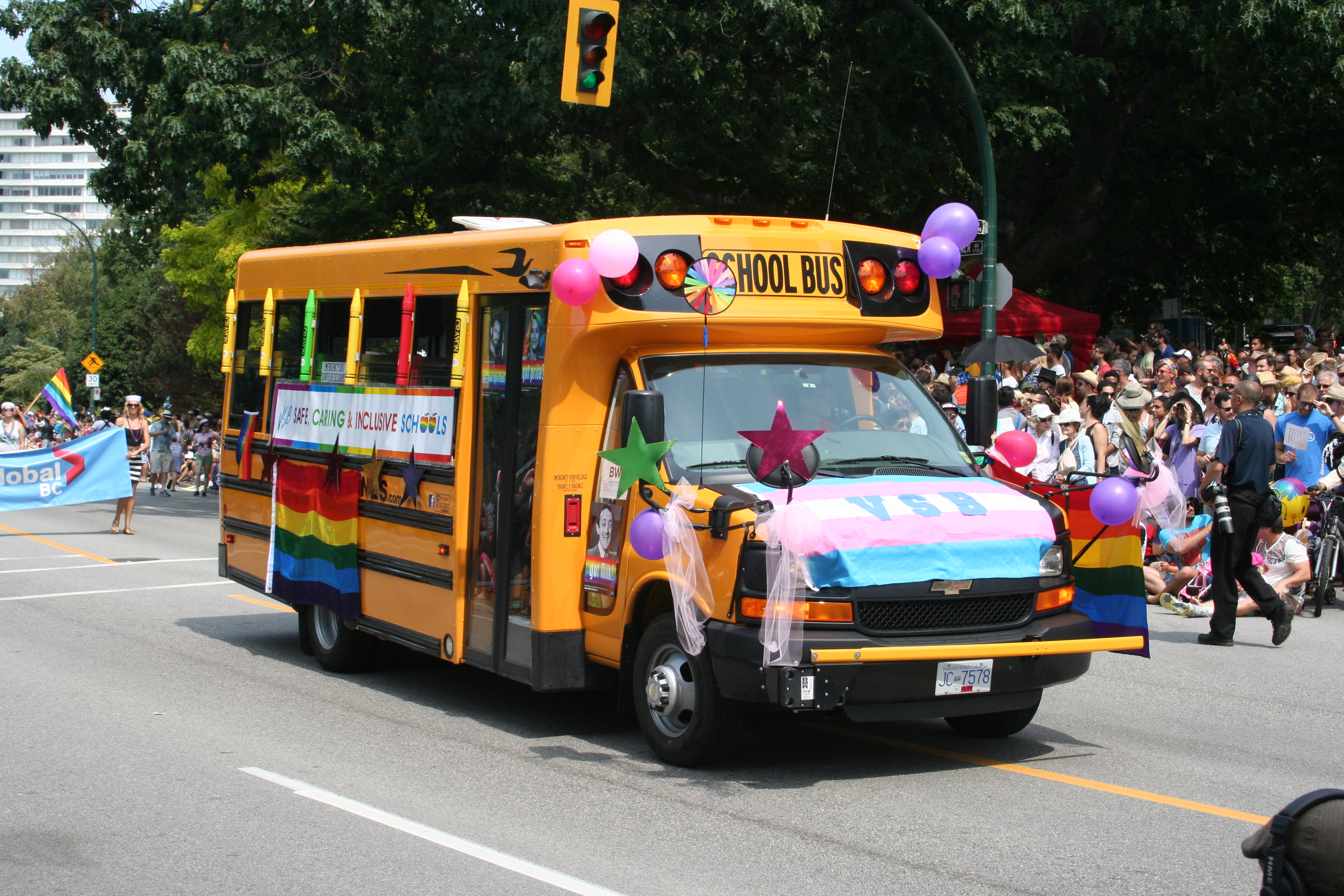
The Transgender flag and Rainbow flag on the side of a school bus in the Vancouver Pride parade 2015.

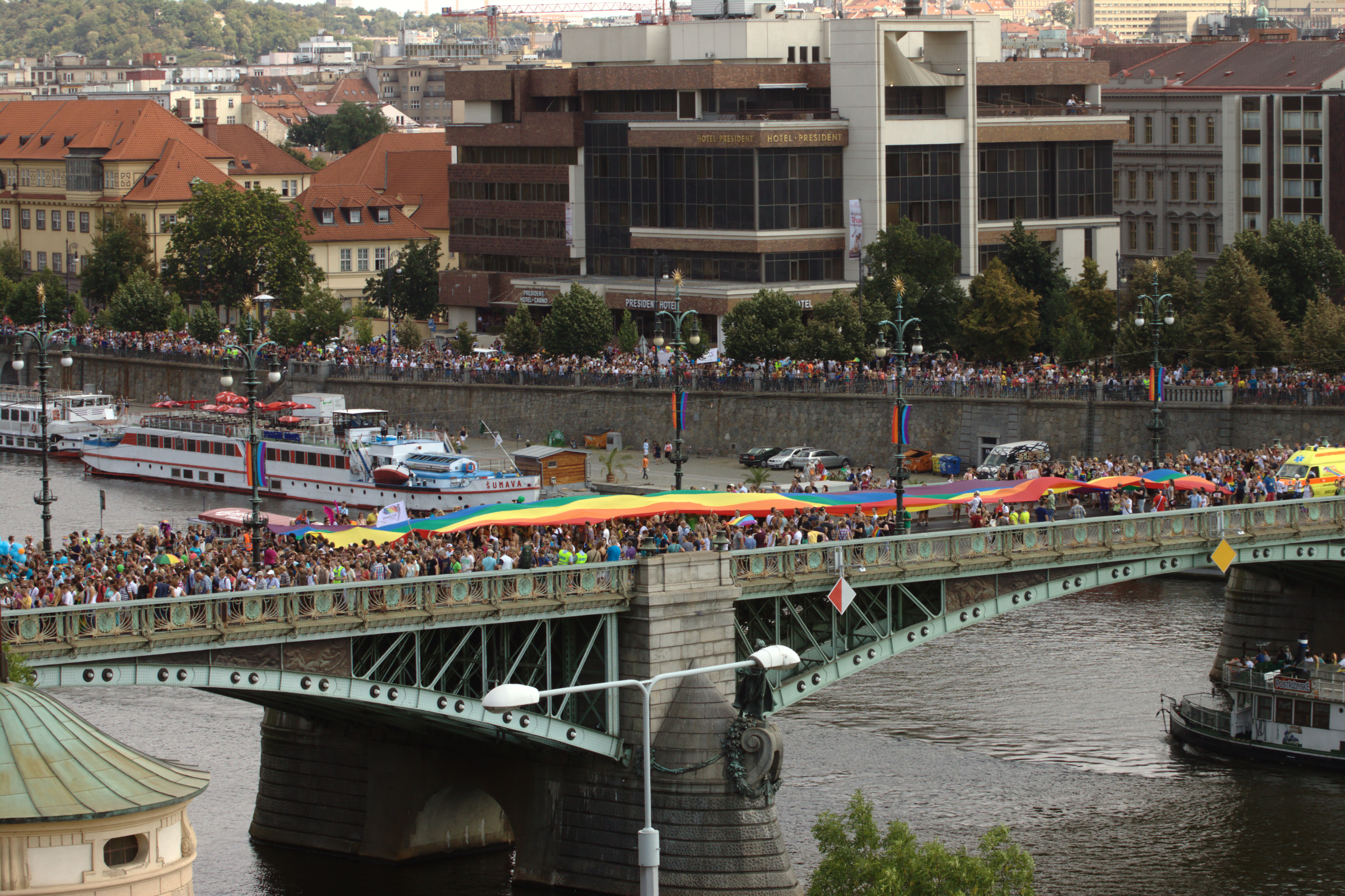
A Rainbow pride flag being carried across the Čechův Bridge during the 2015 Prague pride parade.

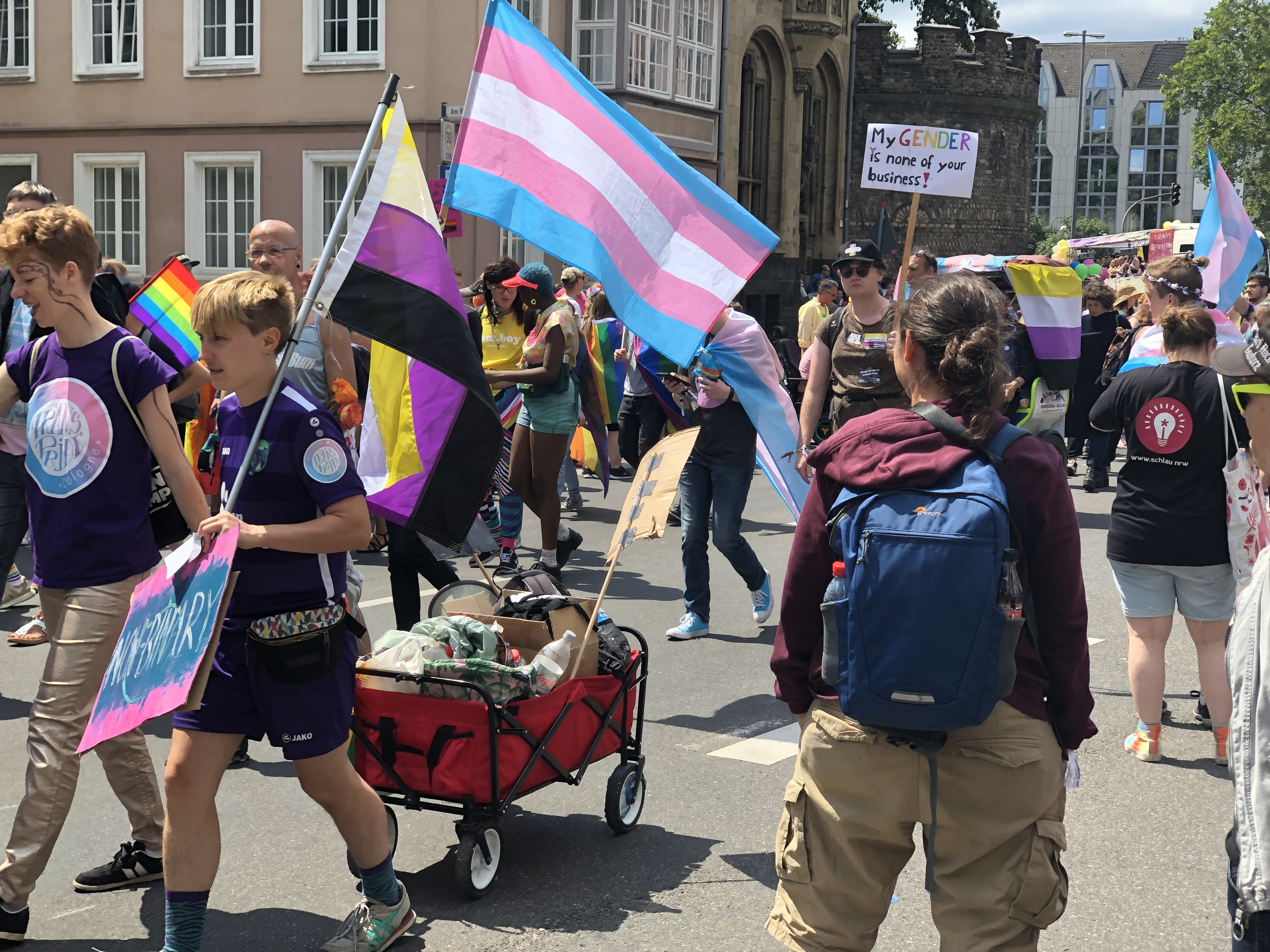
Non-binary flags at the Christopher Street Day parade in Cologne, 2019

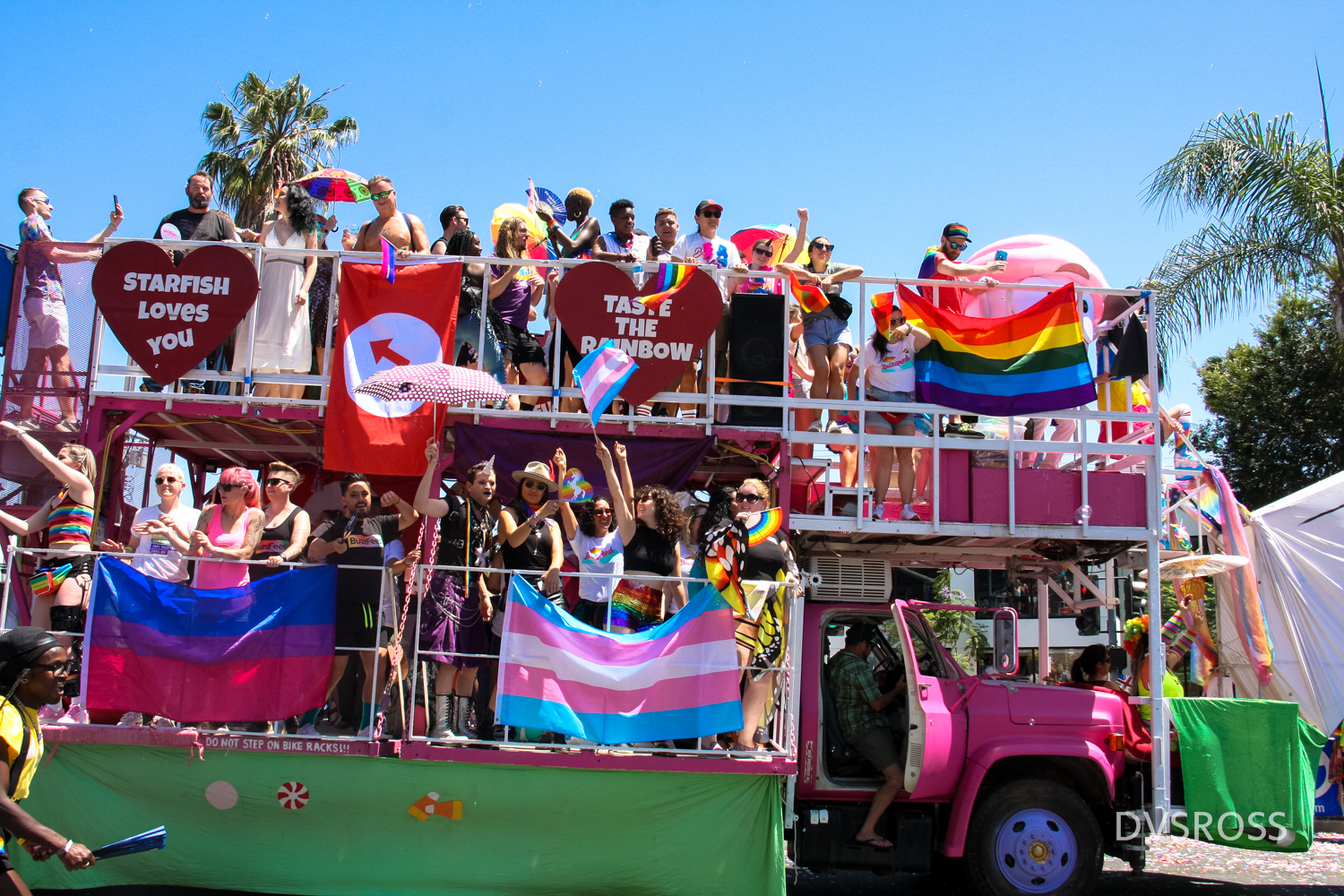
LGBTQIA+ Pride flags on a float at the Los Angeles Pride parade 2019.

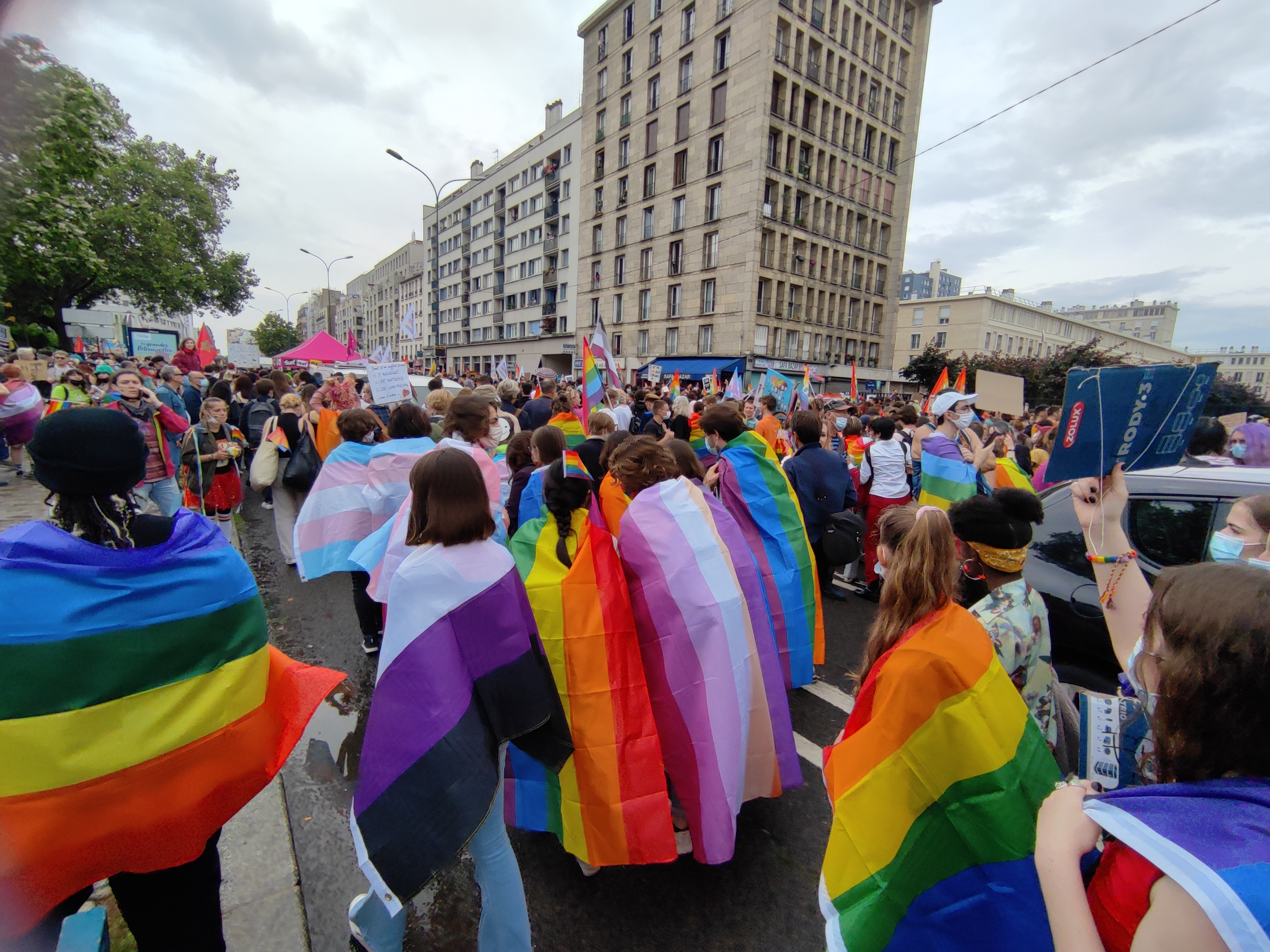
LGBTQIA+ Pride flags in the Paris Pride parade. 2021

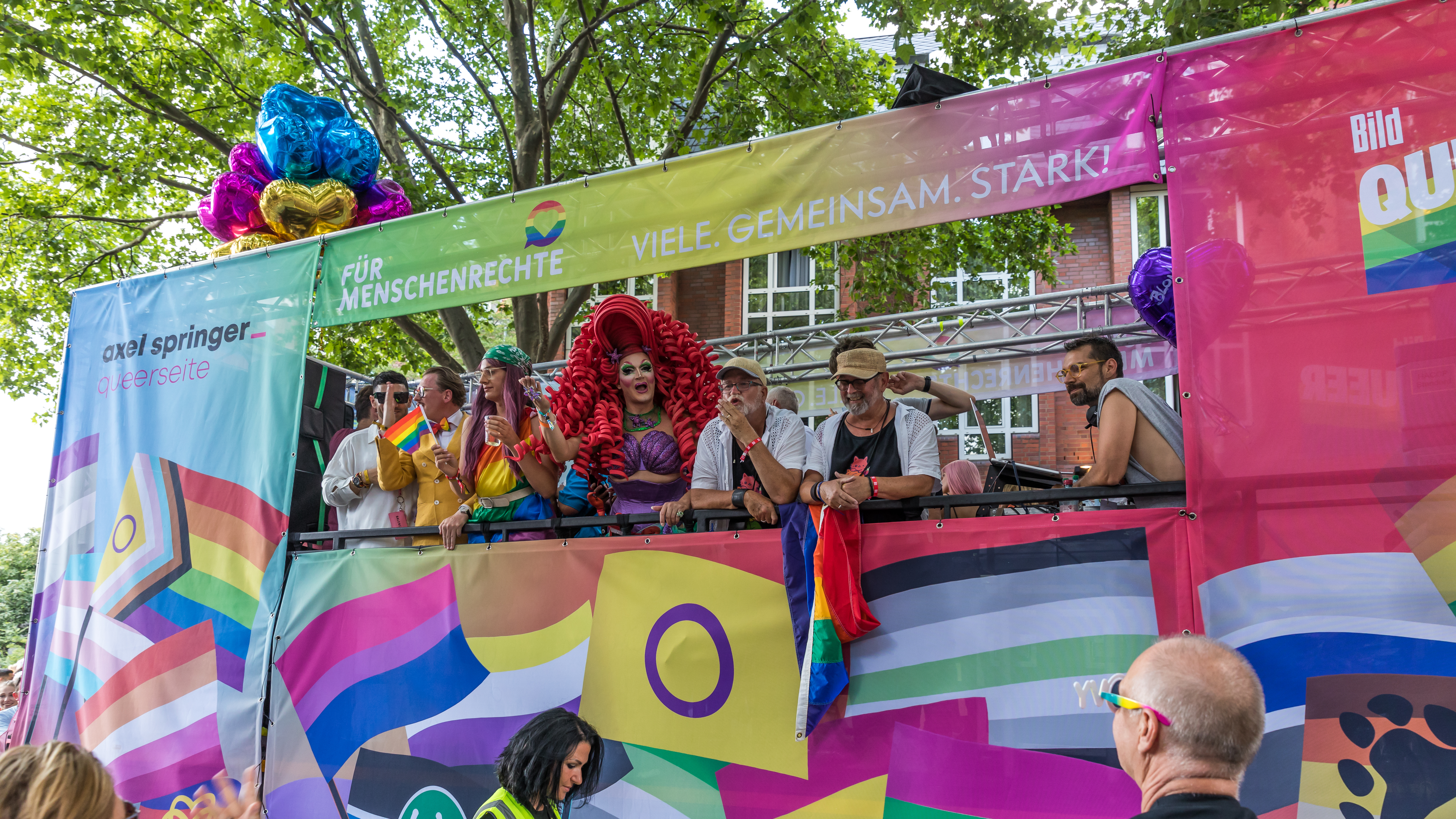
LGBTQIA+ Pride flags in the Christopher Street Day parade in Cologne, 2022.

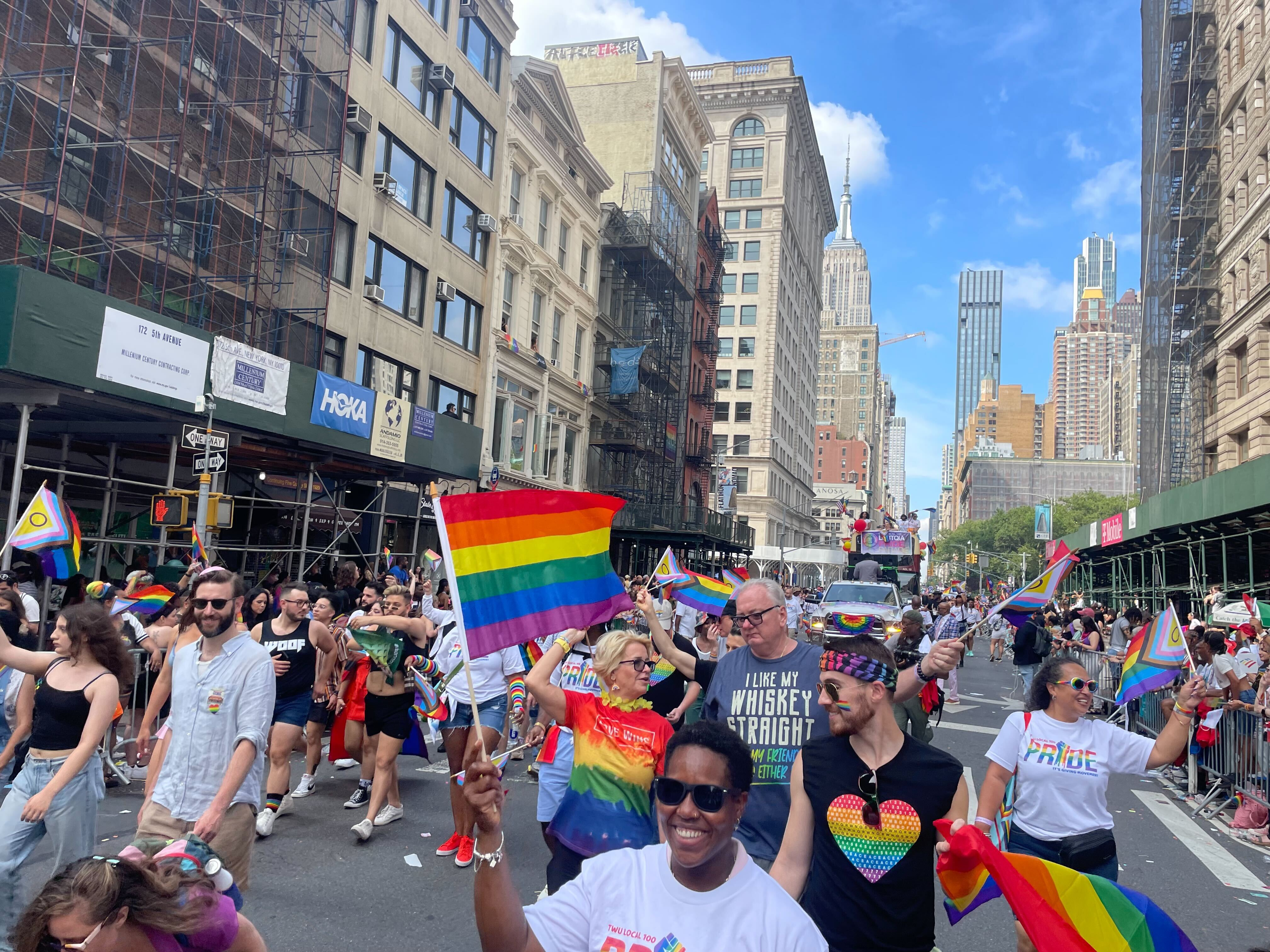
Intersex-inclusive Progress Pride flags at a pride march in New York. 2023

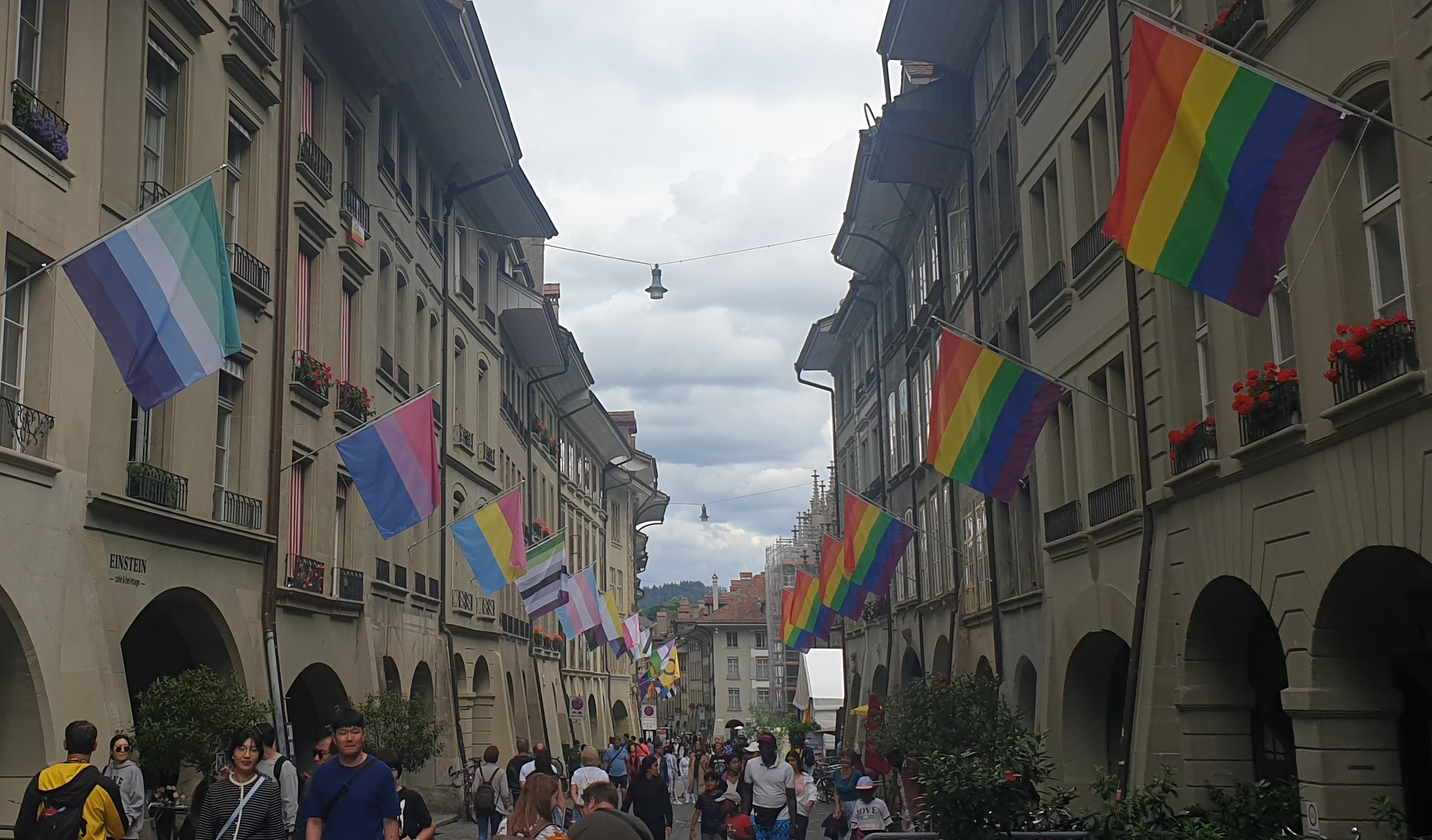
LGBTQIA+ Pride flags in the old town in Bern during the EuroGames 2023.

== Demographics ==
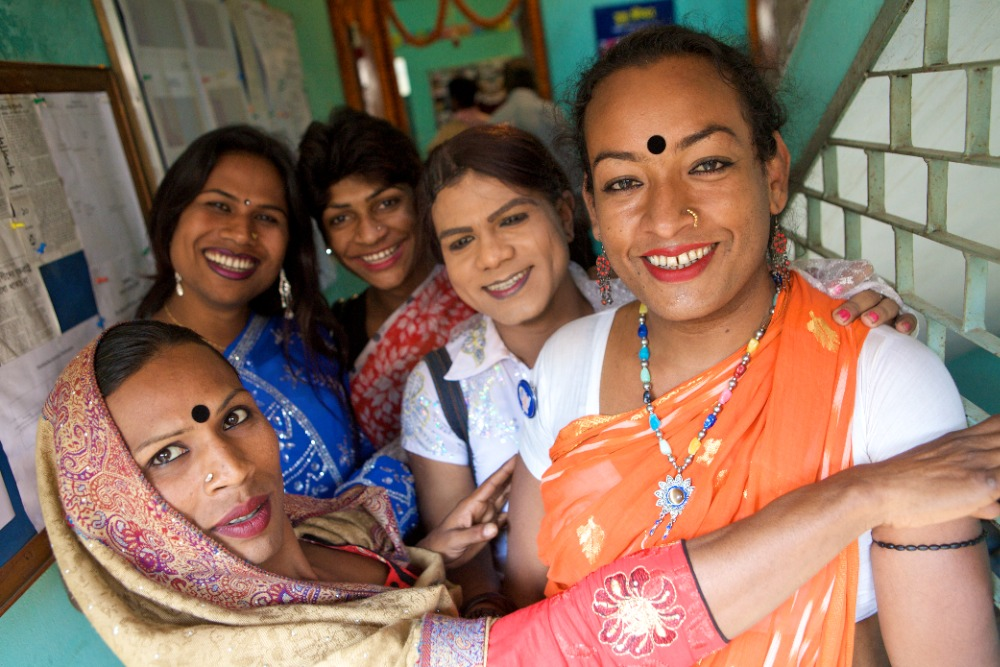
Hijra people in Bangladesh.

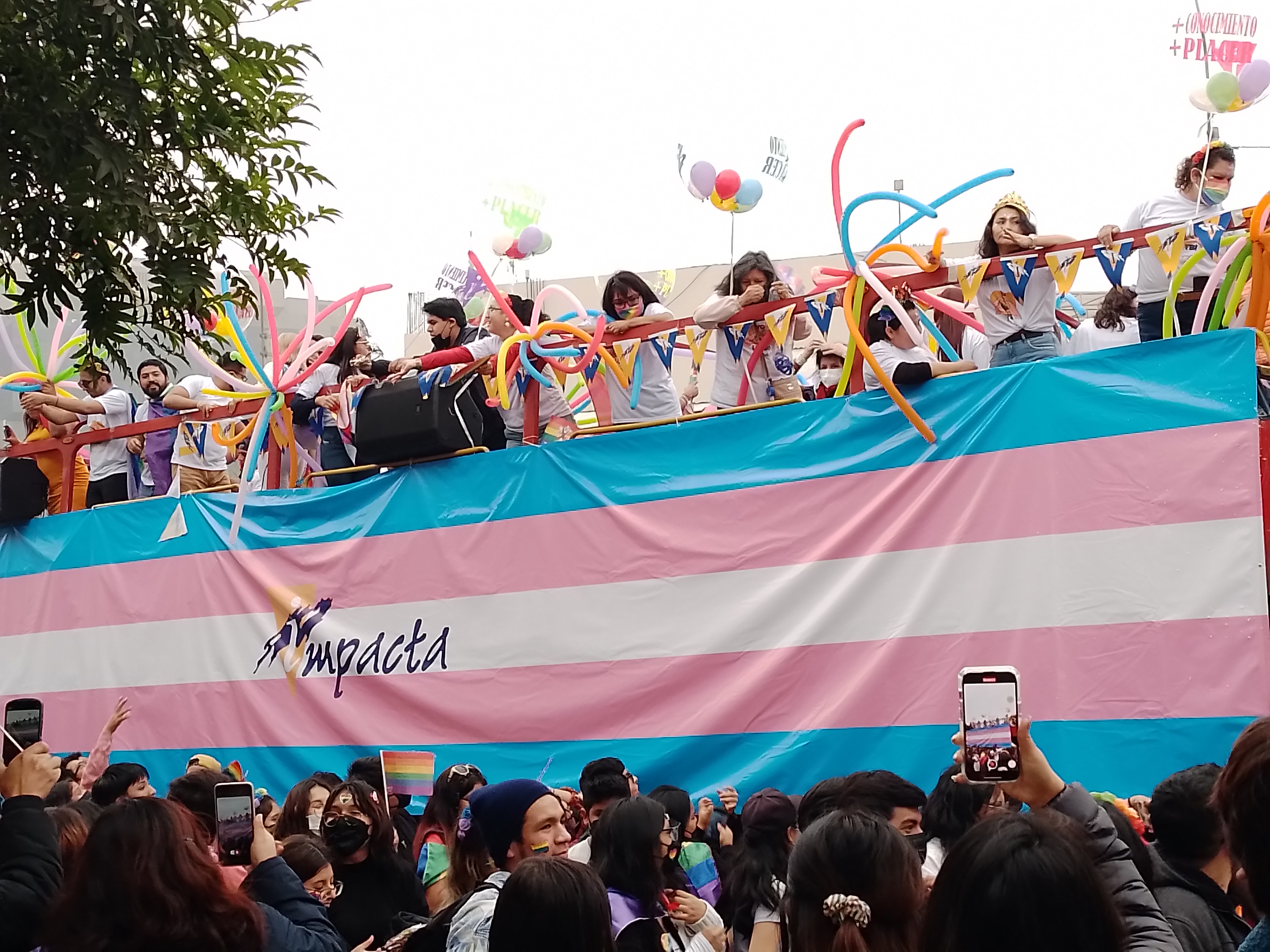
The Transgender pride flag at the Lima pride parade 2022.

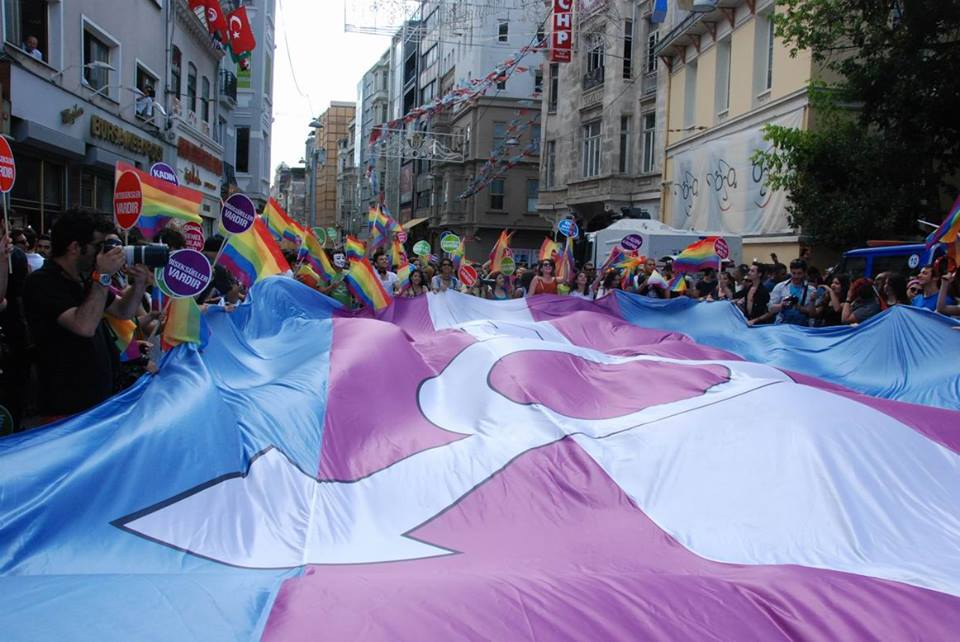
The Transgender pride flag at the Pride March held as part of the events for the 22nd Istanbul Pride Week, 2014. The flag has been overlayed with a female-male symbol.

In a 2012 survey, younger Americans are more likely to identify as gay. Statistics decrease with age, as adults between ages 18–29 are three times more likely to identify as LGBTQ than seniors older than 65. These statistics for the LGBTQ community are taken into account just as they are with other demographics to find trend patterns for specific products. Consumers who identify as LGBTQ are more likely to regularly engage in various activities as opposed to those who identify as heterosexual. According to Community Marketing, Inc., 90 percent of lesbians and 88 percent of gay men will dine out with friends regularly. And similarly, 31 percent of lesbians and 50 percent of gay men will visit a club or a bar.

The likelihood of LGBTQ women having children at home as non-LGBTQ women is equal. LGBTQ men are half as likely when compared with non-LGBTQ men to have children at home. In 2012, household incomes for sixteen percent of LGBTQ Americans ranged above $90,000 per year, in comparison with 21 percent of the overall adult population. Those who identify as LGBTQ have fewer children collectively in comparison to heterosexual partners. LGBTQ populations of color face income barriers along with the rest of the race issues, earn less and are not as affluent.

In 2014, the metropolitan areas with the highest percentage of LGBTQ community was San Francisco, California. The next highest were Portland, Oregon, and Austin, Texas.

A 2019 survey of the Two-Spirit and LGBTQ+ population in the Canadian city of Hamilton, Ontario, called Mapping the Void: Two-Spirit and LGBTQ+ Experiences in Hamilton showed that out of 906 respondents, when it came to sexual orientation, 48.9% identified as bisexual/pansexual, 21.6% identified as gay, 18.3% identified as lesbian, 4.9% identified as queer, and 6.3% identified as other (a category consisting of those who indicated they were asexual, heterosexual, or questioning, and those who gave no response for their sexual orientation).

A 2019 survey of trans and non-binary people in Canada called Trans PULSE Canada showed that out of 2,873 respondents. When it came to sexual orientation, 13% identified as asexual, 28% identified as bisexual, 13% identified as gay, 15% identified as lesbian, 31% identified as pansexual, 8% identified as straight or heterosexual, 4% identified as two-spirit, and 9% identified as unsure or questioning.

A 2021 Gallup survey, found that 7.1% of U.S. adults identify as "lesbian, gay, bisexual, transgender, or something other than straight or heterosexual".

== Discrimination ==
Discrimination against LGBTQ people encompasses the prejudice and negative behaviors targeting the people of the LGBTQ community and specific subgroups: lesbians, gay men, bisexuals, transgender people, queer people, among other sexual and gender minorities.

People in the LGBTQ community face discrimination in form of microaggressions. Microaggressions are usually statements that are indirect and sometimes incidental but which carry a negative connotation. For LGBTQ youths, the most common type of microaggression encountered is the making of political comments, such as criticizing the right to a same-sex relationship. The second most common form of microaggression is the expression of stereotypes about the LGBTQ community. Microaggressions are common and often experienced in everyday life. Safe spaces, such as those in school, can have a significant impact on the occurrence of microaggressions.

Through there has been increasing acceptance of the LGBTQ community there are still many areas of life, such as sports, where discrimination is prominent.

== Rights ==
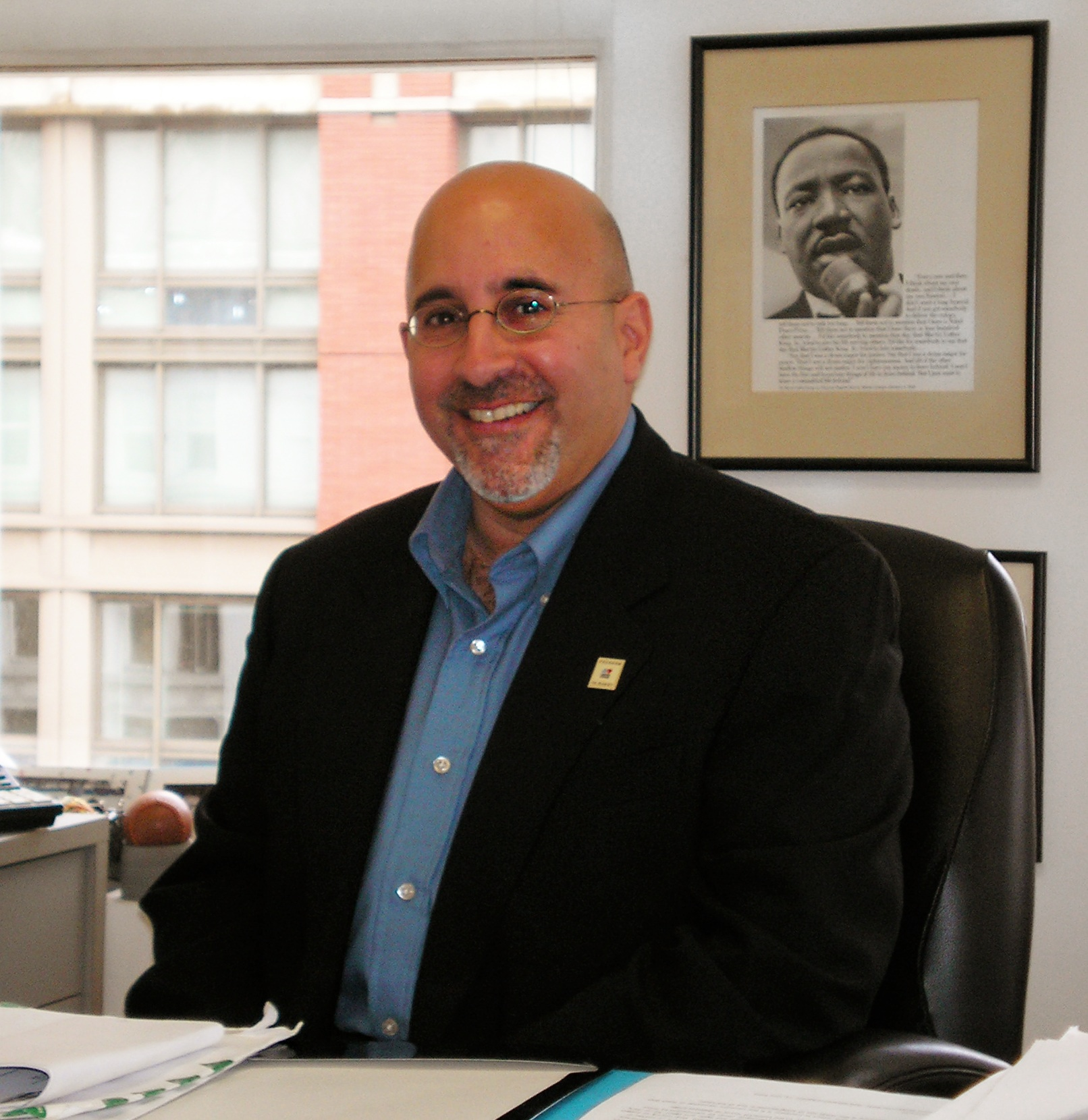
Evan Wolfson of Freedom to Marry argued before the Supreme Court in Boy Scouts of America v. Dale.

The LGBTQ community is a social component of the global community that is believed by many, including heterosexual allies, to be underrepresented in the area of civil rights. The current struggle of the gay community has been largely brought about by globalization. In the United States, World War II brought together many closeted rural men from around the nation and exposed them to more progressive attitudes in parts of Europe.

Upon returning home after the war, many of these men decided to band together in cities rather than return to their small towns. Fledgling communities would soon become political in the beginning of the gay rights movement, including monumental incidents at places like Stonewall. Today, many large cities have gay and lesbian community centers. Many universities and colleges across the world have support centers for LGBTQ students. The Human Rights Campaign, Lambda Legal, the Empowering Spirits Foundation, and GLAAD advocate for LGBTQ people on a wide range of issues in the United States. There is also an International Lesbian and Gay Association.

In 1947, when the United Kingdom adopted the Universal Declaration of Human Rights (UDHR), LGBTQ activists clung to its concept of equal, inalienable rights for all people, regardless of their race, gender, or sexual orientation. The declaration does not specifically mention gay rights, but discusses equality and freedom from discrimination.

In 1962, Clark Polak joined The Janus Society in Philadelphia, Pennsylvania, becoming its president a year later. In 1968, he announced that the Society would be changing their name to Homosexual Law Reform Society; "Homosexuals are now willing to fly under their own colors" (Stewart, 1968).

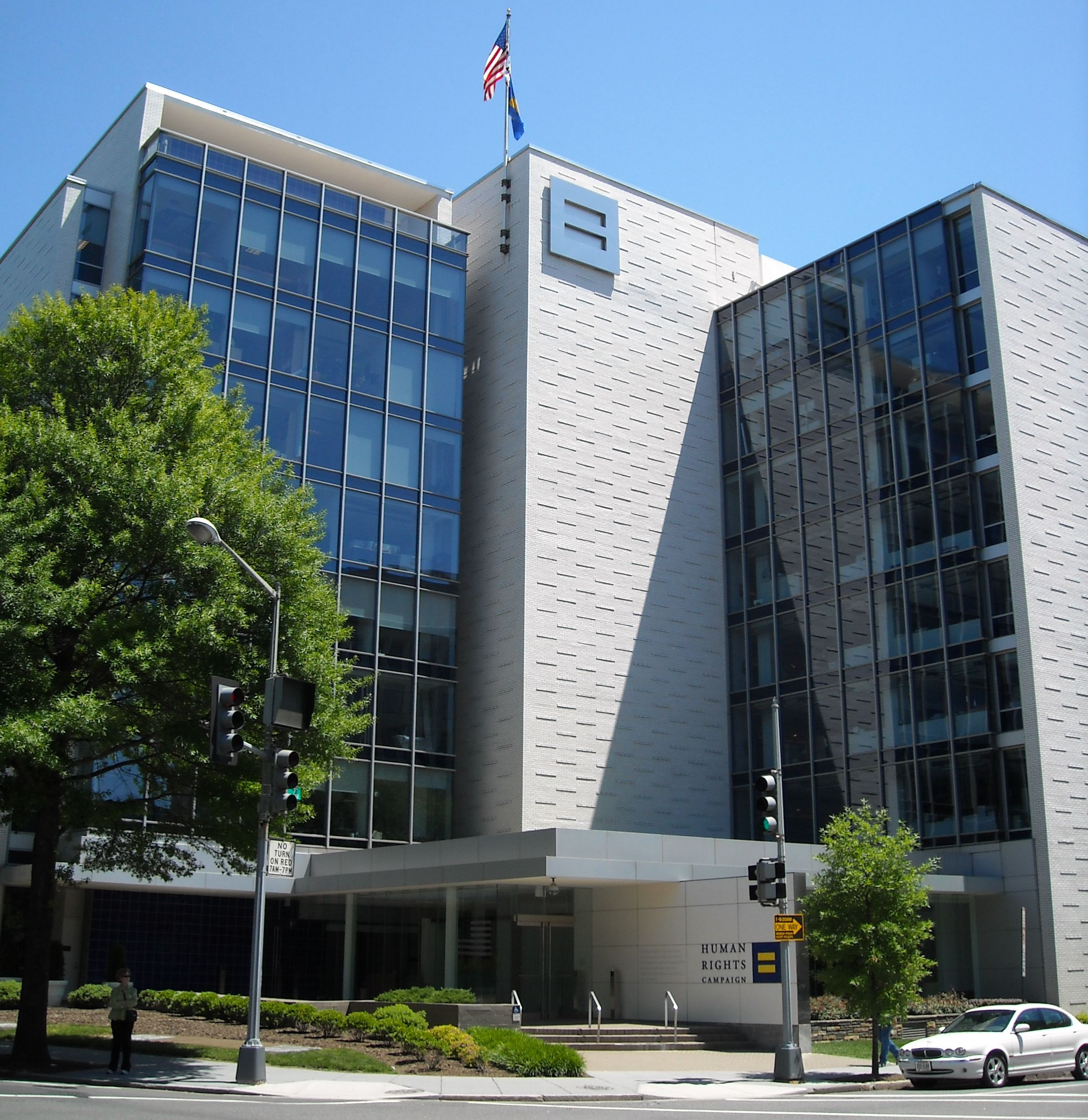
The headquarters of the Human Rights Campaign, one of the largest gay rights organizations in the United States

=== Same-sex marriage ===
In some parts of the world, partnership rights or marriage have been extended to same-sex couples. Advocates of same-sex marriage cite a range of benefits that are denied to people who cannot marry, including immigration, health care, inheritance and property rights, and other family obligations and protections, as reasons why marriage should be extended to same-sex couples. Opponents of same-sex marriage within the gay community argue that fighting to achieve these benefits by means of extending marriage rights to same-sex couples privatizes benefits (e.g., health care) that should be made available to people regardless of their relationship status. They further argue that the same-sex marriage movement within the gay community discriminates against families that are composed of three or more intimate partners. Opposition to the same-sex marriage movement from within the gay community should not be confused with opposition from outside that community.

== Media ==
The contemporary lesbian and gay community has a growing and complex place in the American and Western European media. Lesbians and gay men are often portrayed inaccurately in television, films, and other media; the gay community is often portrayed as many stereotypes, such as gay men being portrayed as flamboyant and bold. Like other minority groups, these caricatures are intended to ridicule this marginalized group.

There is currently a widespread ban of references in child-related entertainment, and when references do occur, they almost invariably generate controversy. In 1997, when American comedian Ellen DeGeneres came out of the closet on her popular sitcom, many sponsors, such as the Wendy's fast food chain, pulled their advertising. Also, a portion of the media has attempted to make the gay community included and publicly accepted with television shows such as Will & Grace or Queer Eye for the Straight Guy. This increased publicity reflects the Coming out movement of the LGBTQ community. As more celebrities came out, more shows developed, such as the 2004 show The L Word. These depictions of the LGBTQ community have been controversial, but beneficial for the community. The increase in visibility of LGBTQ people allowed for the LGBTQ community to unite to organize and demand change, and it has also inspired many LGBTQ people to come out.

In the United States, gay people are frequently used as a symbol of social decadence by celebrity evangelists and by organizations such as Focus on the Family. Many LGBTQ organizations exist to represent and defend the gay community. For example, the Gay and Lesbian Alliance Against Defamation in the United States and Stonewall in the UK work with the media to help portray fair and accurate images of the gay community.

As companies are advertising more and more to the gay community, LGBTQ activists are using ad slogans to promote gay community views. Subaru marketed its Forester and Outback with the slogan "It's Not a Choice. It's the Way We're Built", which was later used in eight U.S. cities on streets or in gay rights events.

=== Social media ===
Social media is often used as a platform for the LGBTQ community to congregate and share resources. Search engines and social networking sites provide numerous opportunities for LGBTQ people to connect with one another; additionally, they play a key role in identity creation and self-presentation. Social networking sites allow for community building as well as anonymity, allowing people to engage as much or as little as they would like. The variety of social media platforms, including Facebook, TikTok, Tumblr, Twitter, and YouTube, have differing associated audiences, affordances and norms.

These platforms allow for more inclusivity as members of the LGBTQ community have the agency to decide where to engage and how to self-present themselves. The existence of the LGBTQ community and discourse on social media platforms is essential to disrupt the reproduction of hegemonic cis-heteronormativity and represent the wide variety of identities that exist.

Before its ban on adult content in 2018, Tumblr was a platform uniquely suited for sharing trans stories and building community. Mainstream social media platforms like TikTok have also been beneficial for the trans community by creating spaces for folks to share resources and transition stories, normalizing trans identity. It has been found that access to LGBTQ content, peers, and community on search engines and social networking sites has allowed for identity acceptance and pride within LGBTQ community.

Algorithms and evaluative criteria control what content is recommended to users on search engines and social networking site. These can reproduce stigmatizing discourses that are dominant within society, and result in negatively impacting LGBTQ self-perception. Social media algorithms have a significant impact on the formation of the LGBTQ community and culture. Algorithmic exclusion occurs when exclusionary practices are reinforced by algorithms across technological landscapes, directly resulting in excluding marginalized identities. The exclusion of these identity representations causes identity insecurity for LGBTQ people, while further perpetuating cis-heteronormative identity discourse. LGBTQ users and allies have found methods of subverting algorithms that may suppress content in order to continue to build these online communities.

== Buying power ==
In 2006, the buying power of United States gays and lesbians was approximately $660 billion and was then expected to exceed $835 billion by 2011. Gay consumers can be very loyal to specific brands, wishing to support companies that support the gay community and also provide equal rights for LGBTQ workers. In the UK, this buying power is sometimes abbreviated to "the pink pound."

According to an article by James Hipps, LGBTQ Americans are more likely to seek out companies that advertise to them and are willing to pay higher prices for premium products and services. This can be attributed to the median household income compared to same-sex couples to opposite-sex couples, as they are twice as likely to have graduated from college, twice as likely to have an individual income over $60,000 and twice as likely to have a household income of $250,000 or more.

=== Consumerism ===
Although many claims that the LGBTQ community is more affluent when compared to heterosexual consumers, research has proven that false. However, the LGBTQ community is still an important segment of consumer demographics because of the spending power and loyalty to brands that they have. In 2013, Witeck-Combs Communications calculated the adult LGBTQ buying power at $830 billion. Same-sex partnered households spend slightly more than the average home on any given shopping trip. They also make more shopping trips compared to the non-LGBTQ households. When comparing the LGBTQ community to heterosexuals they are seen to be more reckless with their spending.

On average, the difference in spending with same-sex partnered home is 25 percent higher than the average United States household. According to the University of Maryland gay male partners earn $10,000 less on average compared to heterosexual men. However, partnered lesbians receive about $7,000 more a year than heterosexual married women. Hence, same-sex partners and heterosexual partners are about equal concerning consumer affluence.

The LGBTQ community has been recognized for being one of the largest consumers in travel. Travel includes annual trips, and sometimes even multiple annual trips. Annually, the LGBTQ community spends around $65 billion on travel, totaling 10 percent of the United States travel market. Many common travel factors play into LGBTQ travel decisions, but if there is a destination that is especially tailored to the LGBTQ community, then they are more likely to travel to those places.

=== Marketing ===
Marketing towards the LGBTQ community was not always a strategy among advertisers. For the last three to four decades, Corporate America has created a market niche for the LGBTQ community. Three distinct phases define the marketing turnover: 1) shunning in the 1980s, 2) curiosity and fear in the 1990s, and 3) pursuit in the 2000s.

In recent years, marketing oriented towards the LGBTQ dynamic has increased. With a spike in same-sex marriage in 2014, marketers are figuring out new ways to tie in a person's sexual orientation to a product being sold. In efforts to attract members of the LGBTQ community to their products, market researchers are developing marketing methods that reach these new families. Advertising history has shown that when marketing to the family, it was always the wife, the husband, and the children. Today, that is not necessarily the case. There could be families of two fathers or two mothers with one child or six children. Breaking away from the traditional family setting, marketing researchers notice the need to recognize these different family configurations.

One area that marketers are subject to fall under is stereotyping the LGBTQ community. When marketing towards the community, they may corner their target audience into an "alternative" lifestyle category that ultimately "others" the LGBTQ community. Sensitivity is important when marketing towards the community. When marketing towards the LGBTQ community, advertisers respect the same boundaries.

Marketers also refer to LGBTQ as a single characteristic that makes an individual. Other areas can be targeted along with the LGBTQ segment such as race, age, culture, and income levels. Knowing the consumer gives these marketers power.

Along with attempts to engage with the LGBTQ community, researchers have found gender disagreements among products with respective consumers. For instance, a gay male may want a more feminine product, whereas a lesbian female may be interested in a more masculine product. This does not hold for the entire LGBTQ community, but the possibilities of these differences are far greater.

In the past, gender was seen as fixed, and a congruent representation of an individual's sex. It is understood now that sex and gender are fluid separately. Researchers also noted that when evaluating products, a person's biological sex is as equal is a determinant as their self-concept. As a customer response, when the advertisement is directed towards them, gay men and women are more likely to have an interest in the product. This is an important factor and goal for marketers because it indicates future loyalty to the product or brand.

== Multiculturalism ==
LGBTQ multiculturalism is the diversity within the LGBTQ community of different sexual orientations and gender identities—as well as different ethnic and religious groups within the LGBTQ community. Some promote the inclusion of the LGBTQ community into a larger multicultural model, for example in universities; such a multicultural model includes the LGBTQ community together with other minority groups such as African Americans in the United States.

The two movements have much in common politically. Both are concerned with tolerance for real differences, diversity, minority status, and the invalidity of value judgments applied to different ways of life.

Researchers have identified the emergence of gay and lesbian communities during several progressive time periods across the world including: the Renaissance, Enlightenment, and modern Westernization. Depending on geographic location, some of these communities experienced more opposition to their existence than others; nonetheless, they began to permeate society both socially and politically.

=== European cities past and present ===
City spaces in early modern Europe were host to a wealth of gay activity; however, these scenes remained semi-secretive for a long period of time. Dating back to the 1500s, city conditions such as apprenticeship labor relations and living arrangements, abundant student and artist activity, and hegemonic norms surrounding female societal status were typical in Venice and Florence, Italy. Under these circumstances, many open minded young people were attracted to these city settings. Consequently, an abundance of same-sex interactions began to take place.

Many of the connections formed then often led to the occurrence of casual romantic and sexual relationships, the prevalence of which increased quite rapidly over time until a point at which they became a subculture and community of their own. Literature and ballroom culture gradually made their way onto the scene and became integrated despite transgressive societal views. Perhaps the most well-known of these are the balls of Magic-City. Amsterdam and London have also been recognized as leading locations for LGBTQ community establishment.

By the 1950s, these urban spaces were booming with gay venues such as bars and public saunas where community members could come together. Paris and London were particularly attracting to the lesbian population as platforms for not only socialization, but education as well. A few other urban occasions that are important to the LGBTQ community include Carnival in Rio de Janeiro, Brazil, Mardi Gras in Sydney, Australia, as well as the various other pride parades hosted in bigger cities around the world.

=== Urban spaces in the United States ===
In the same way in which LGBTQ community used the city backdrop to join socially, they were able to join forces politically as well. This new sense of collectivity provided somewhat of a safety net for individuals when voicing their demands for equal rights. In the United States specifically, several key political events have taken place in urban contexts. Some of these include, but are not limited to:

- Independence Hall, Philadelphia - gay and lesbian protest movement in 1965 – activists led by Barbara Gittings started some of the first picket lines here. These protests continued on and off until 1969. Gittings went on to run the Gay and Lesbian Task Force of the American Library Association for 15 years.
- The Stonewall Inn, on Christopher Street in Greenwich Village, Manhattan – the birthplace of the modern gay rights movement in 1969 – for the first time, a group of gay men and drag queens fought back against police during a raid on this small bar in Greenwich Village. The site is now a U.S. National Historic Landmark.
- Castro Street, San Francisco – gathering place for LGBTQ community beginning in the 1970s; this urban spot was an oasis of hopefulness. Home to the first openly gay elected official Harvey Milk and the legendary Castro Theater, this cityscape remains iconic to the LGBTQ community.
- Cambridge, Massachusetts City Hall, was the site of the first same-sex marriage in U.S. history in 2004. Following this event, attempts by religious groups in the area to ban it have been stifled and many more states have joined the Commonwealth.
- AIDS Activities Coordinating Office, Philadelphia – an office to help stop the spread of HIV/AIDS, by providing proper administrative components, direct assistance, and education on HIV/AIDS.

During and following these events, LGBTQ community subculture began to grow and stabilize into a nationwide phenomenon. Gay bars became more and more popular in large cities. For gays particularly, increasing numbers of cruising areas, public bath houses, and YMCAs in these urban spaces continued to welcome them to experience a more liberated way of living. For lesbians, this led to the formation of literary societies, private social clubs, and same-sex housing. The core of this community-building took place in New York City and San Francisco, but cities like St. Louis, Lafayette Park in WA, and Chicago quickly followed suit.

=== City ===
Cities afford a host of prime conditions that allow for better individual development as well as collective movement that are not otherwise available in rural spaces. First and foremost, urban landscapes offer LGBTQ community better prospects to meet each other and form networks and relationships. One ideal platform within this framework was the free labor market of many capitalistic societies, which enticed people to break away from their often damaging traditional nuclear families in order to pursue employment in bigger cities. Making the move to these spaces afforded them new liberty in the realms of sexuality, identity, and kinship.

Some researchers describe this as a phase of resistance against the confining expectations of normativity. Urban LGBTQ community demonstrated this pushback through various outlets, including their style of dress, the way they talked and carried themselves, and how they chose to build community. From a social science perspective, the relationship between the city and the LGBTQ community is not a one-way street. LGBTQ community gives back as much, if not more, in terms of economic contributions (i.e., "pink money"), activism and politics too.

== Intersections of race ==
Compared to white LGBTQ people, LGBTQ people of color often experience prejudice, stereotyping, and discrimination on the basis of not only their sexual orientation and gender identity, but also on the basis of race. Nadal and colleagues discuss LGBTQ people of color and their experience of intersectional microaggressions which target various aspects of their social identities. These negative experiences and microaggressions can come from cisgender and heterosexual white people, cisgender and heterosexual people of their own race, and from the LGBTQ community themselves, which is usually dominated by white people.

Some LGBTQ people of color do not feel comfortable and represented within LGBTQ spaces. A comprehensive and systematic review of the existing published research literature around the experiences of LGBTQ people of color finds a common theme of exclusion in largely white LGBTQ spaces. These spaces are typically dominated by white LGBTQ people, promote White and Western values, and often leave LGBTQ people of color feeling as though they must choose between their racial community or their gender and sexual orientation community. In general, Western society will often subtly code "gay" as white; white LGBTQ people are often seen as the face of LGBTQ culture and values.

The topic of coming out and revealing one's sexual orientation and gender identity to the public is associated with white values and expectations in mainstream discussions. Where white Western culture places value on the ability to speak openly about one's identity with family, one particular study found that LGBTQ participants of color viewed their family's silence about their identity as supportive and accepting. For example, collectivist cultures view the coming out process as a family affair rather than an individual one. Furthermore, the annual National Coming Out Day centers on white perspectives as an event meant to help an LGBTQ person feel liberated and comfortable in their own skin.

For some LGBTQ people of color, National Coming Out Day is viewed in a negative light. In communities of color, coming out publicly can have adverse consequences, risking their personal sense of safety as well as that of their familial and communal relationships. White LGBTQ people tend to collectively reject these differences in perspective on coming out, resulting in possibly further isolating LGBTQ people of color.

== See also ==
- Bisexual community
- Gay friendly
- Gay male culture
- Homosocialization
- LGBTQ culture
- LGBTQ history
- LGBTQ movements
- LGBTQ symbols
- List of gay villages
- African-American LGBT community
- Queercore
- Autism and LGBTQ identities
