= Prague Pride =

Annual LGBTQ+ pride festival in Prague, Czech Republic

- Status: Active
- Genre: Pride parade and festival
- Frequency: Annually
- Venue: Various locations across Prague
- Locations: Prague, Czech Republic
- Country: Czech Republic
- Inaugurated: 10 August 2011
- Founder: Daniel Goris, Daniel Kupšovský, Marek Mojžíšek
- Attendance: 60,000 (2022, parade record)
- Organiser: Prague Pride Association
- Website: www.praguepride.com

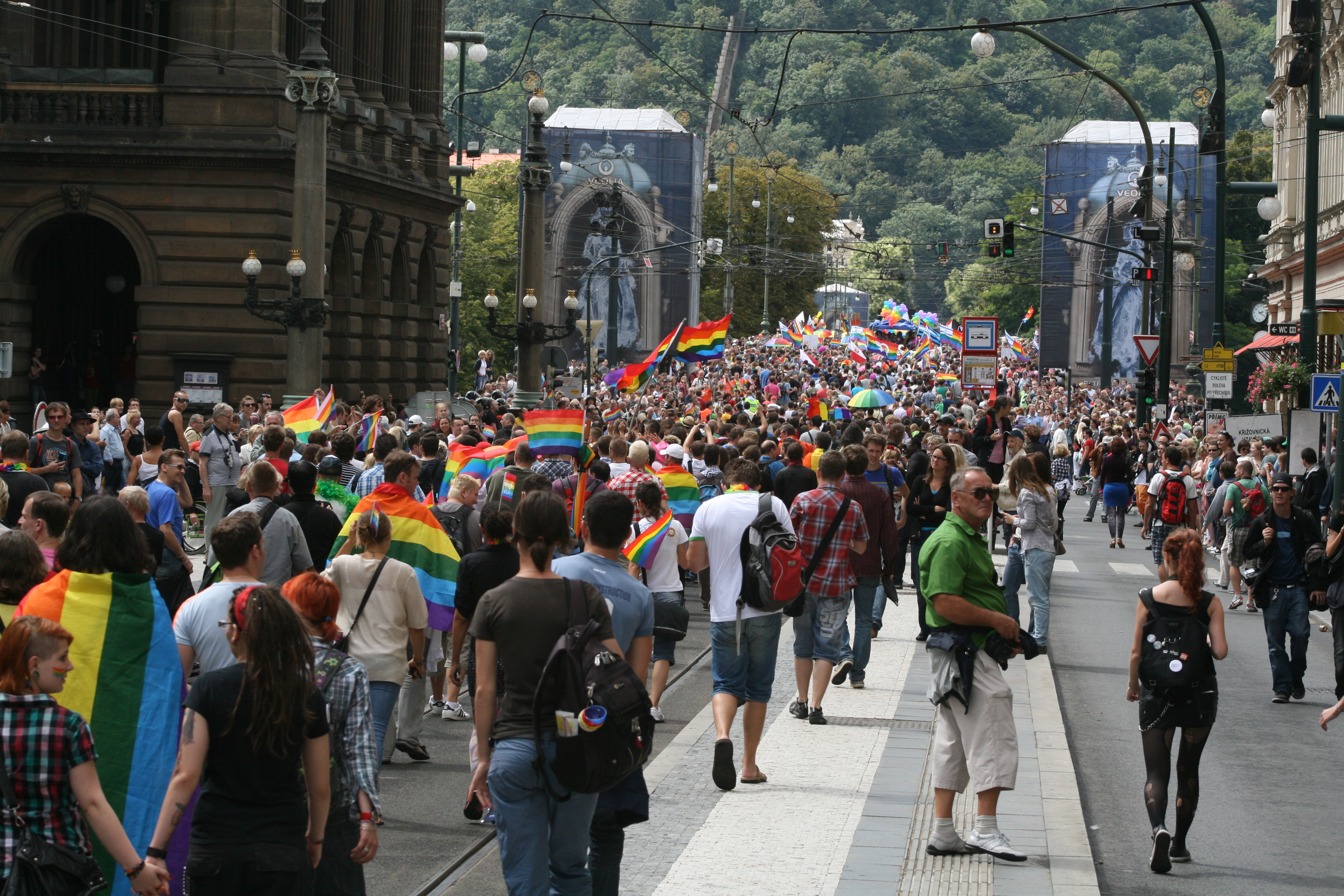
The parade heading from Národní Street toward Legion Bridge, during the festival's first edition in 2011.

Prague Pride is an annual LGBTQ+ pride festival held in Prague, Czech Republic. It first took place in August 2011. The festival lasts a week with events including public discussions, debates, workshops, sports events, cultural activities, and a parade on the last day, which is Saturday.

== History ==
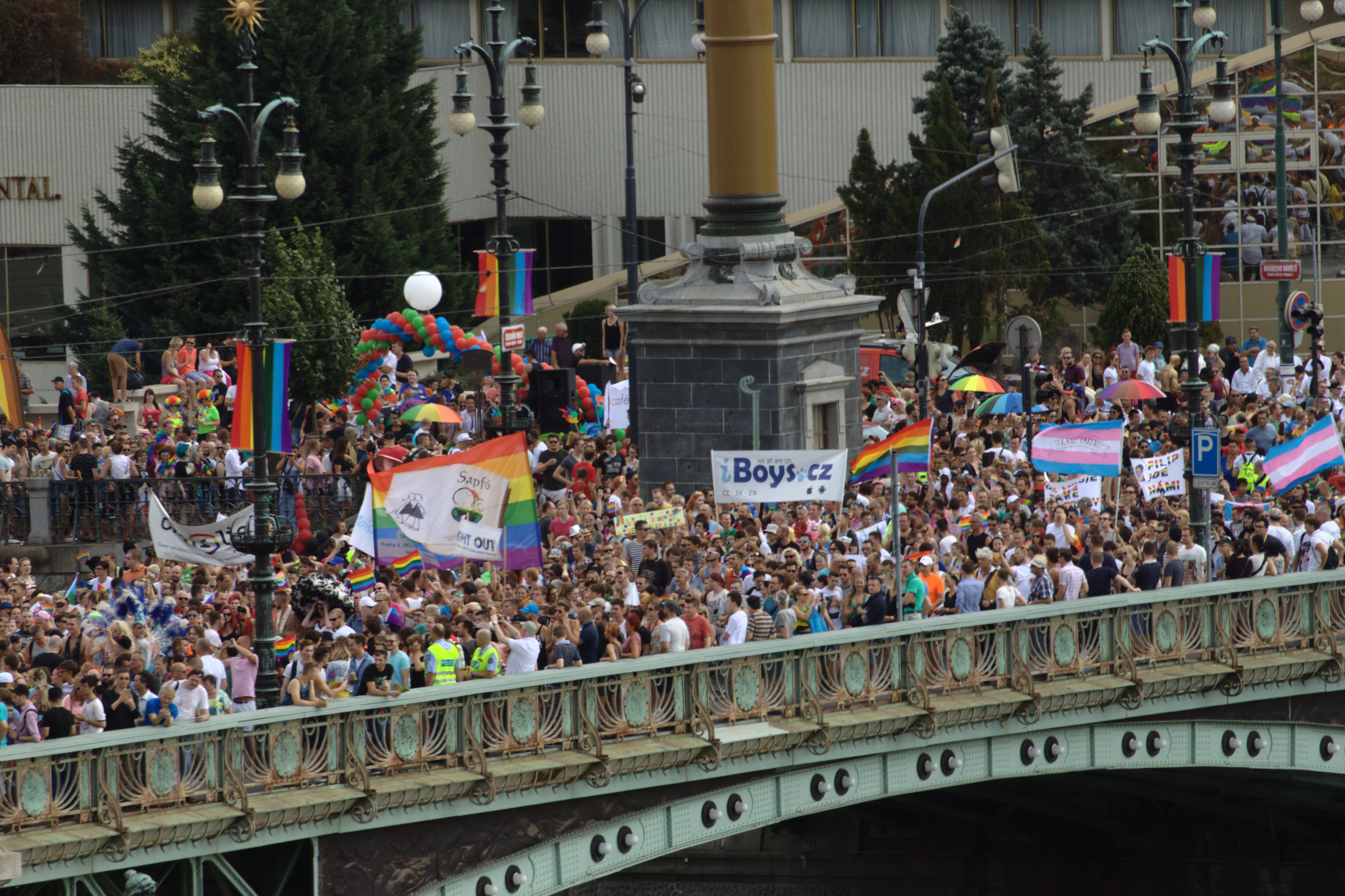
Transgender pride flags and Rainbow flags in the Prague Pride parade as it crosses the Čechův Bridge, 2015.

=== 2011–2013: Early years ===
The first Prague Pride festival took place in 2011 and was attended by 8,000 people. The 2011 pride ran from 10 to 14 August 2011 and included approximately 60 to 80 events across 30 venues in Prague.

At the time, a top aide to then-President Václav Klaus, Deputy Chancellor Petr Hájek, labeled gay people as "deviants." President Klaus refused to distance himself from these remarks. The ambassadors of 13 Western nations, including the UK and US, issued a joint statement in support of the festival. A group of counter-demonstrators gathered, and the Conservative Christian Democrats also held a counter-parade.

The 2012 pride was attended by an estimated 15,000 people.

=== 2014–2019 ===
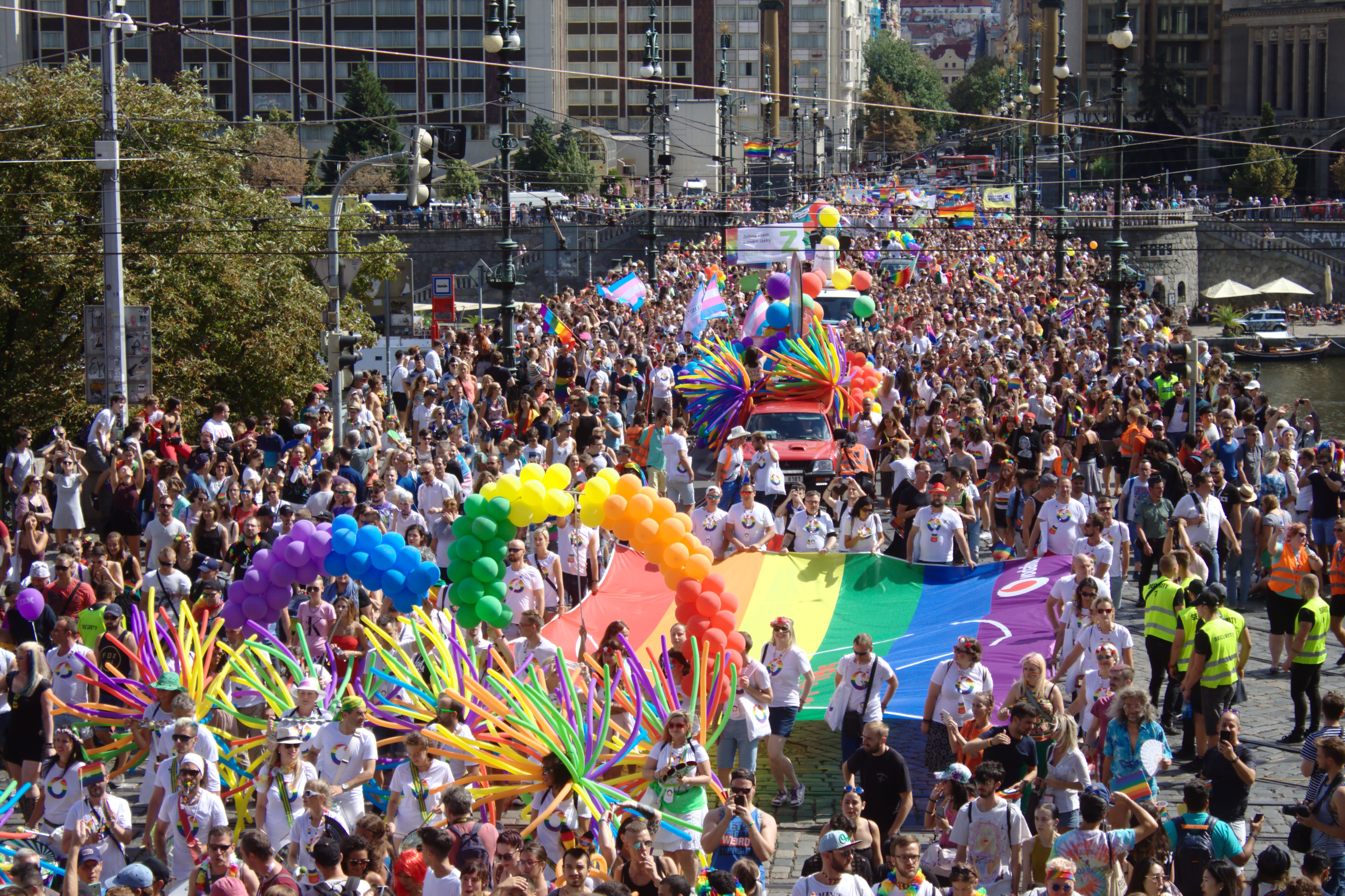
The Pragus pride parade on the Čechův Bridge, 2018

In 2019, the festival was targeted by several incidents. The rainbow flag on the Legion Bridge was burned, Roman candles were shot at visitors in the Pride Village, and 50 litres of oil was poured on the steps leading to Letná Plain where the parade was scheduled to pass. An opposing group also tried to infiltrate the parade but were stopped by police.

In the same year, Prague City Hall flew the rainbow flag for the first time in support of the festival. The event was attended by about 30,000 people.

=== 2020–2021: COVID-19 pandemic ===
In 2020, the parade was replaced with a Rainbow Cruise on the Vltava River and virtual events due to the COVID-19 pandemic. The same occurred in 2021.

=== 2022–2025 ===
In 2022, the parade was attended by 60,000 participants. It took place from 8 to 14 August.

The 2024 edition took place from 5 to 11 August under the theme "Family is Where Love Is." It included 213 events.

In 2025, the 15th edition was held from 28 July to 2 August 2025 under the theme "Kde domov můj?"( "Where is my home?"). Approximately 45,000 people took part in the parade, and 15,000 attended the program at Letná. The parade started at Wenceslas Square and ended at Letná. The program included approximately 180 events across eight festival venues. Foreign Minister Jan Lipavský joined the parade, and Prague Public Transit Company decorated vehicles with rainbow flags.

== Program ==
The festival features multiple events during the week. The Pride Parade, a rainbow-colored parade through Prague on Saturday, is the culmination of the festival. The parade starts at Wenceslas Square, proceeds through the city center, and ends at Letná Park. The festival's events include lectures, discussions, film screenings, theater performances, sporting events, concerts, parties and picnics.

== Religious reception ==
Prague Archbishop Dominik Duka wrote a letter to Mayor Svoboda opposing the parade event in 2011. The festival has been supported by various Christian communities, including the Evangelical Church of Czech Brethren and the Czechoslovak Hussite Church.

== Pedophilia controversy ==
Critics have raised concerns about pedophiles attempting to participate in the festival parade, though the organizers have rejected their involvement.

== Gallery ==
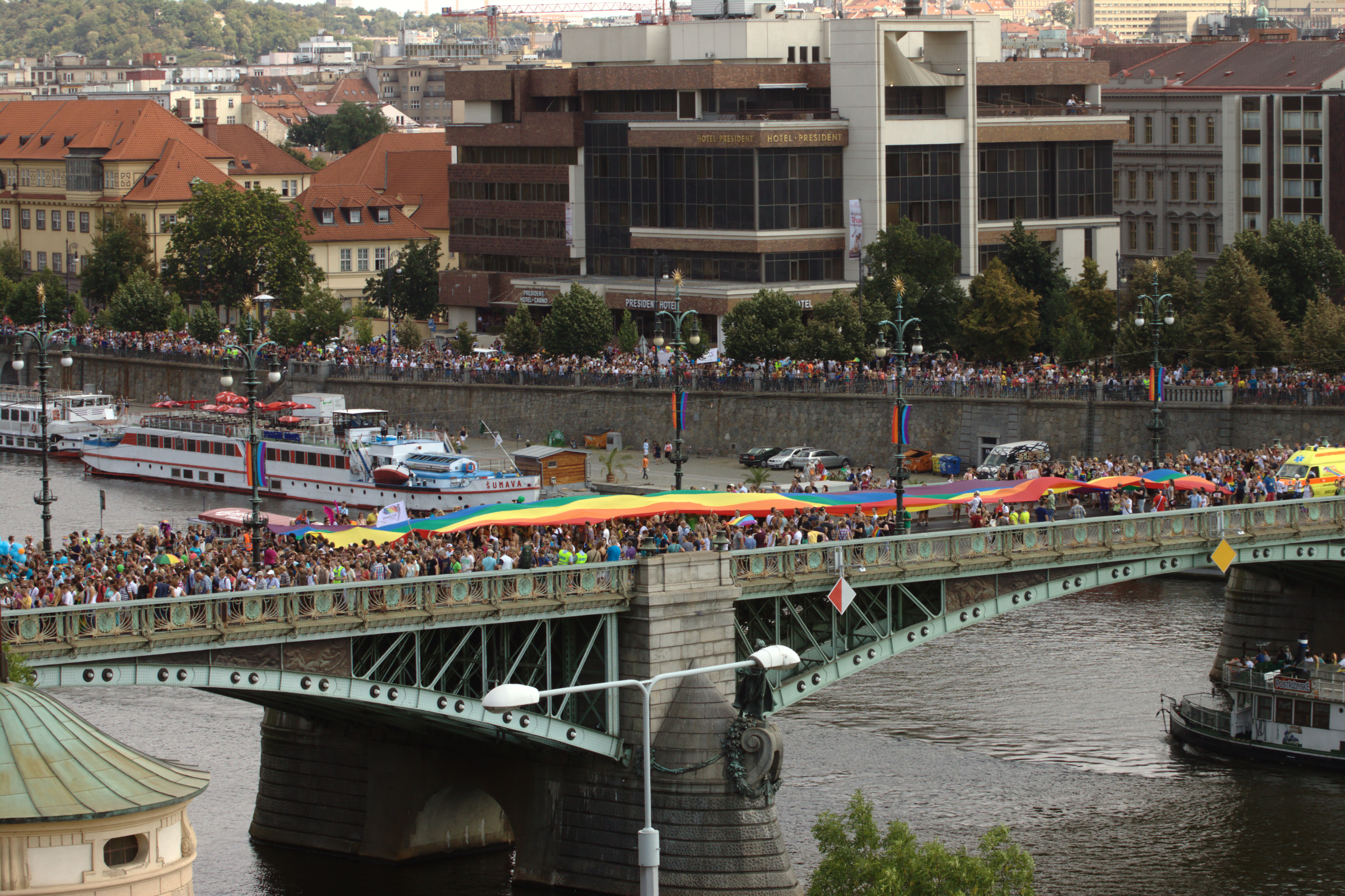
A Rainbow pride flag being carried across the Čechův Bridge during the 2015 Prague pride parade.

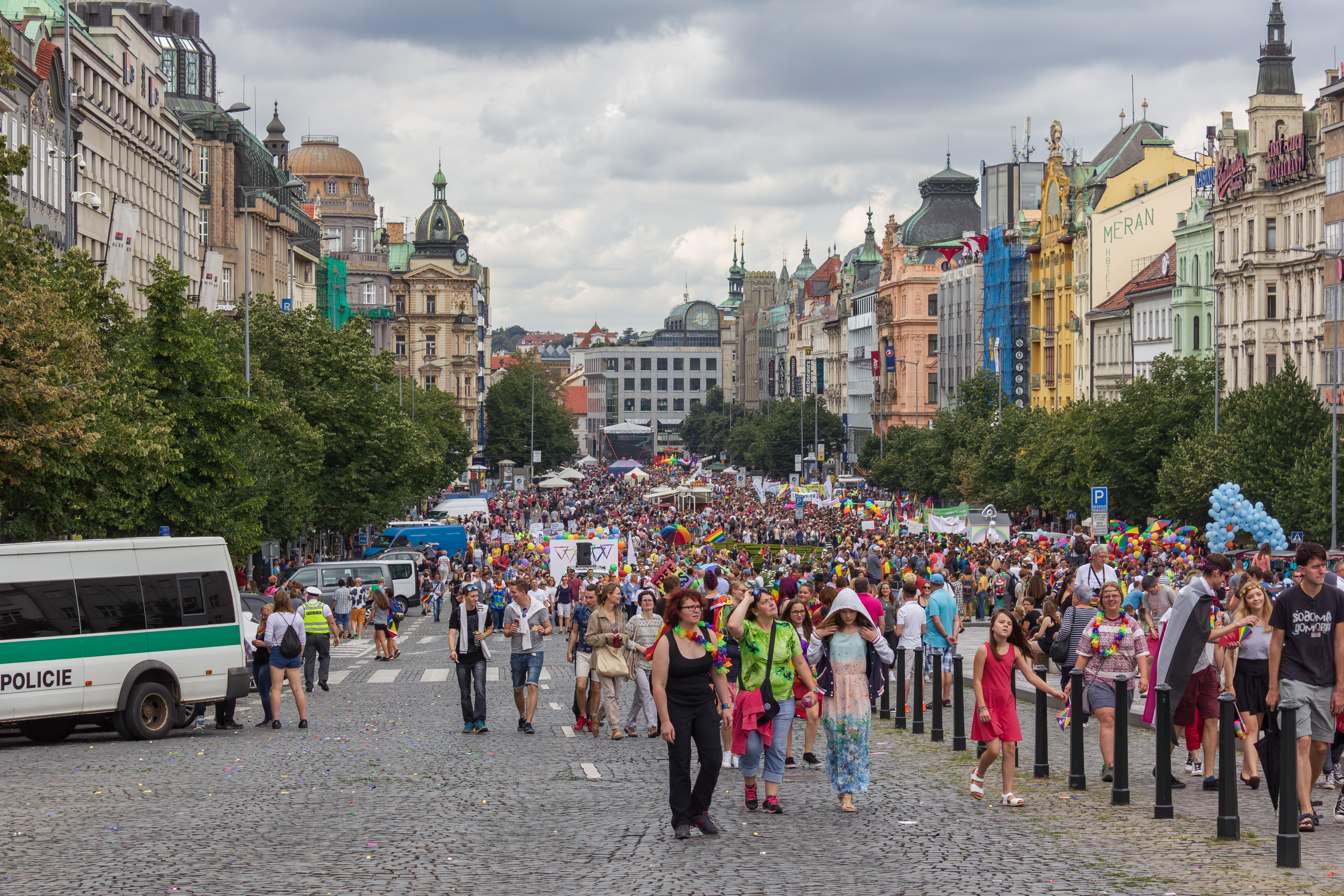
A view of the Prague Pride parade from the top of Wenceslas Square. 2016

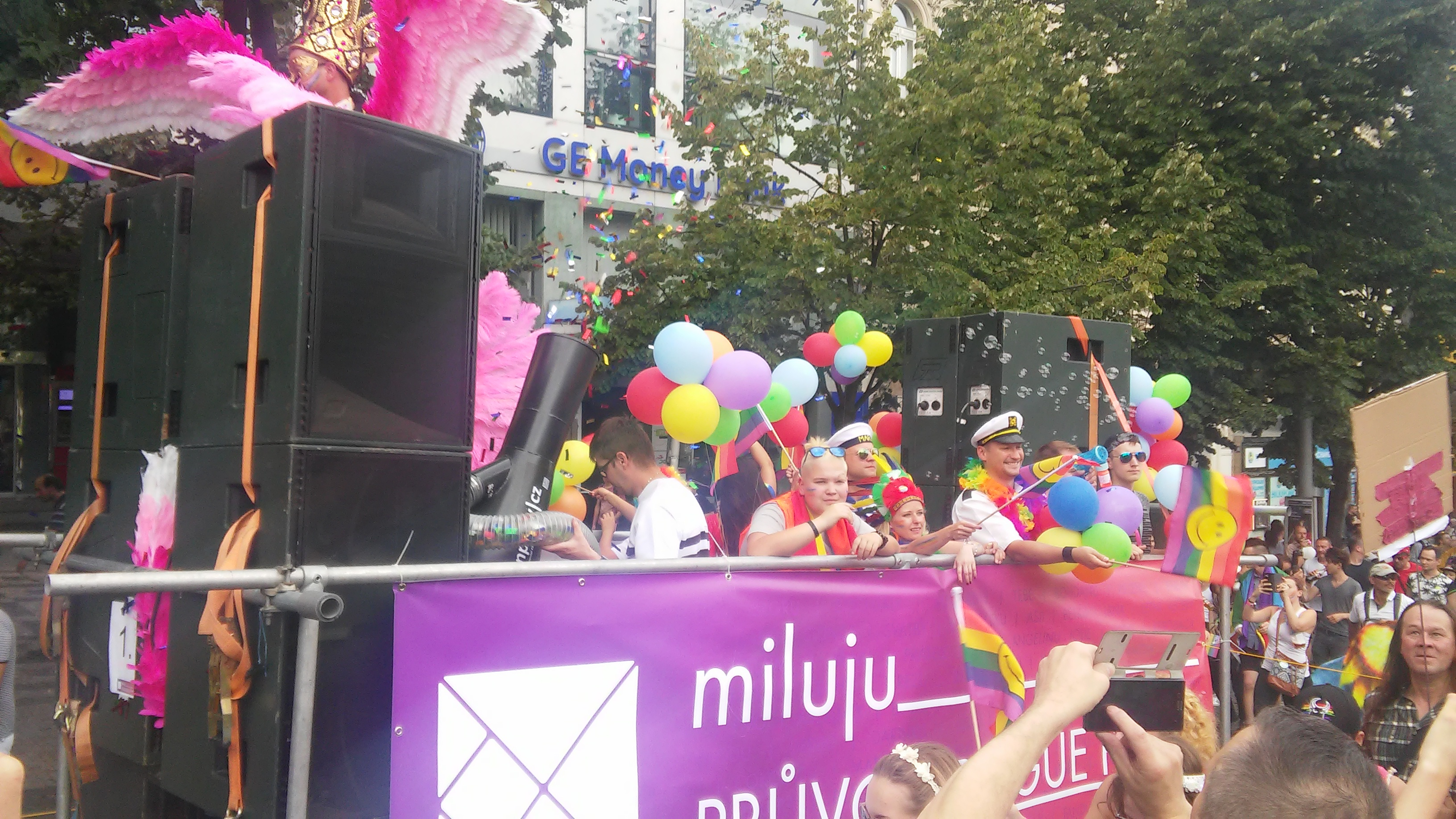
A float in the parade in Wenceslas Square. 2016

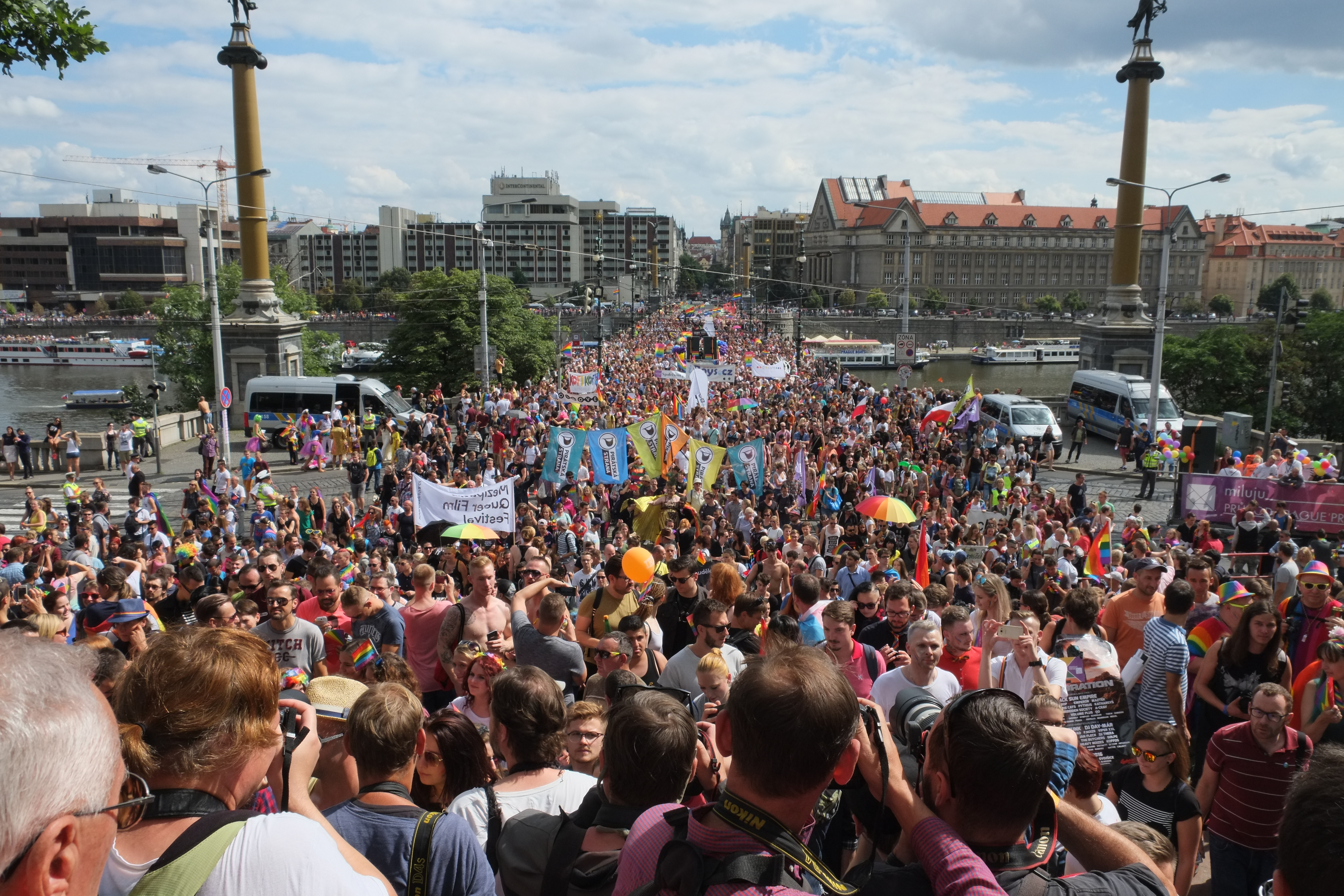
The parade on Čechův Bridge, 2016

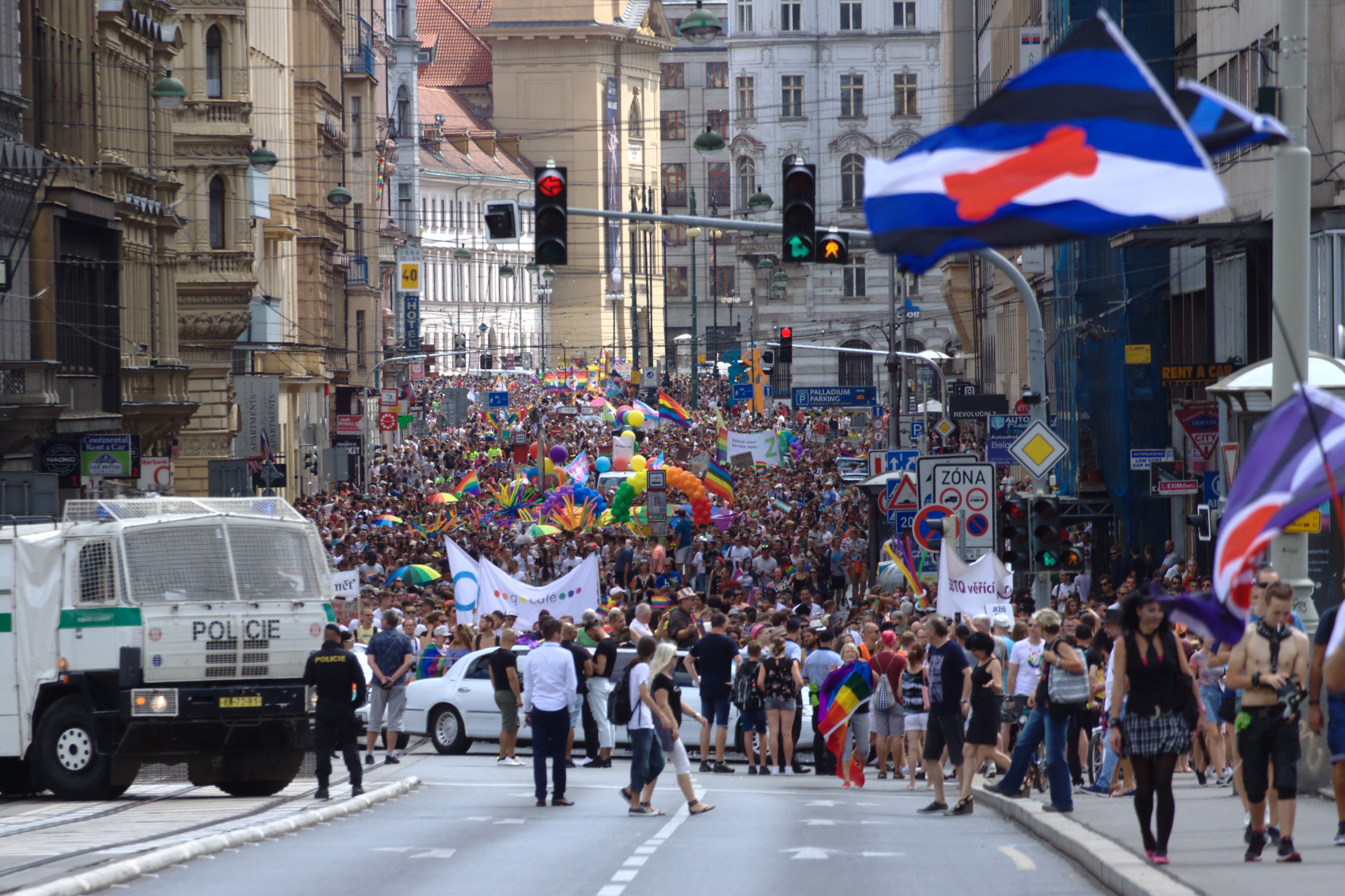
A view from Revolucini street of the Prague pride parade. In the background is Republic square. 2018

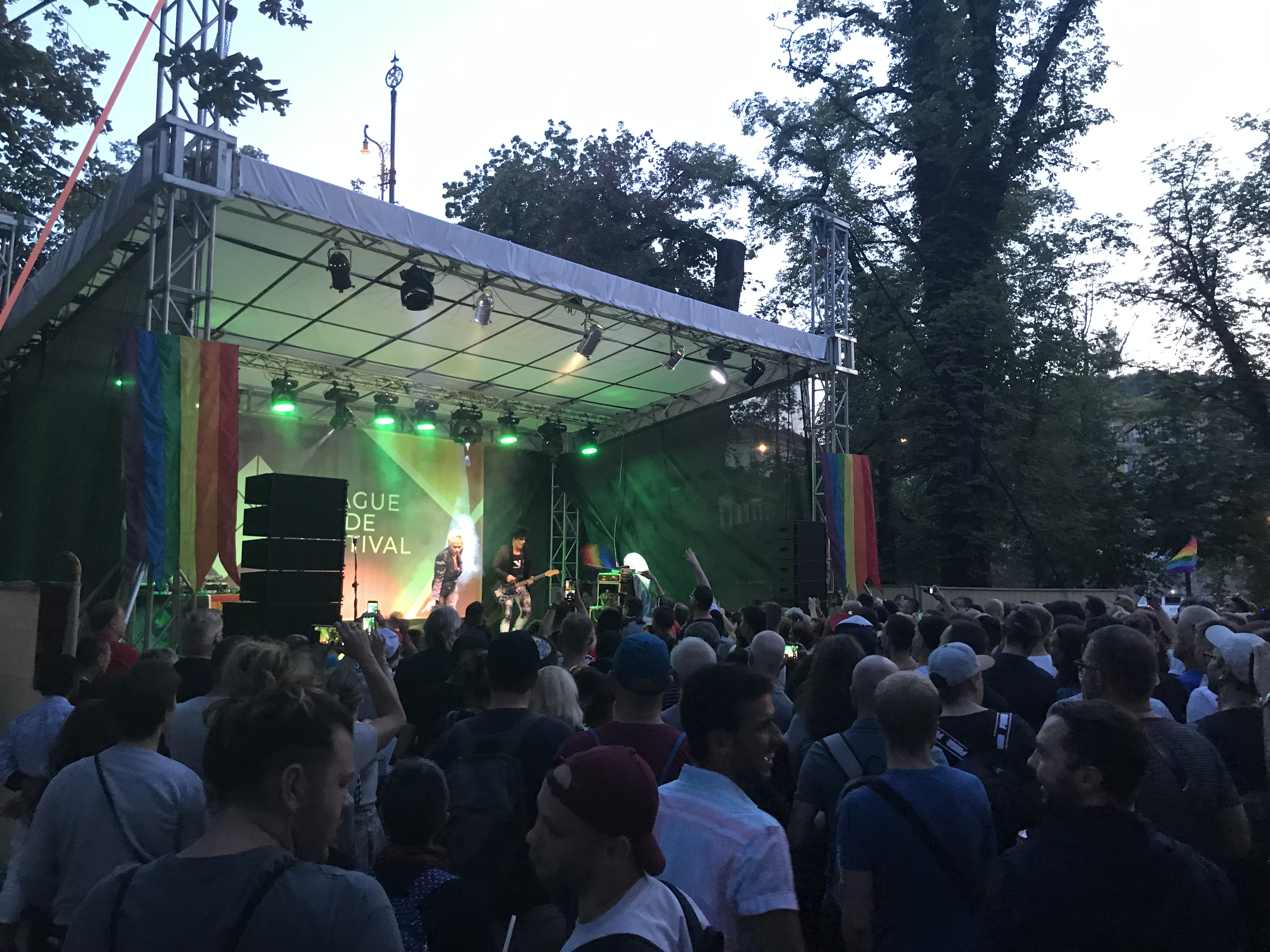
A drag show on Střelecký Island, 2019
