= Svatopluk Čech Bridge =

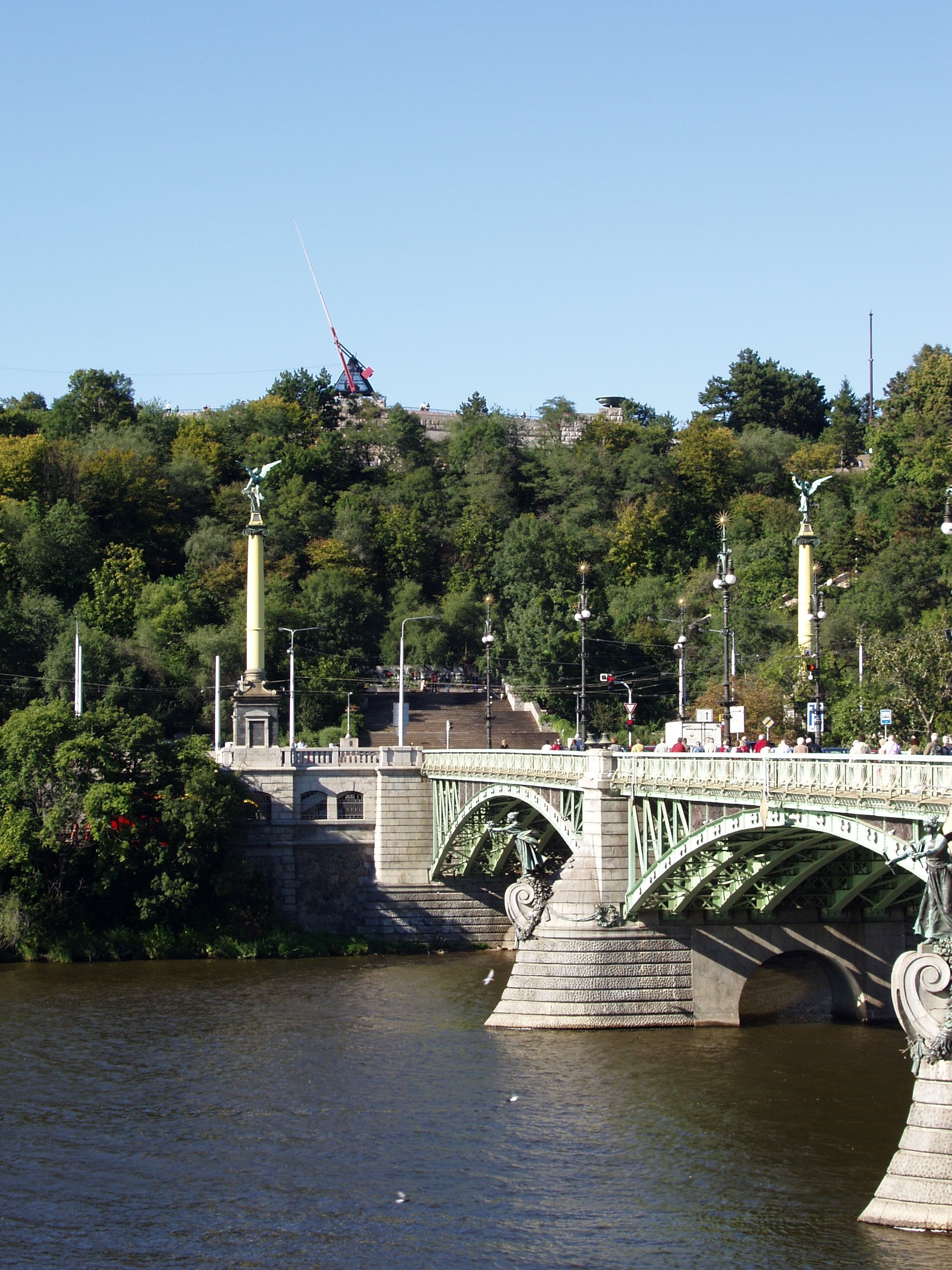
- View from Old Town
- Coordinates: 50°05′N 14°25′E
- Carries: road, tram
- Crosses: Vltava
- Locale: Prague
- Official name: Čechův most
- Maintained by: Technická správa komunikací

Characteristics
- Design: arch bridge
- Total length: 169 metres (554 ft)
- Width: 16 metres (52 ft)
- Longest span: 59 metres (194 ft)

History
- Construction start: 1905
- Construction end: 1908
- Opened: 6 June 1908

Location
- Interactive map of Svatopluk Čech Bridge

Svatopluk Čech Bridge or Čech Bridge (Czech: Čechův most) is an arch bridge over the river Vltava in Prague, Czech Republic.

== History and description ==
Construction of the bridge started in 1905 and finished in 1908. The bridge has a length of 169 m (554 ft) (one of the shortest in Prague) and a width of 16 m (52 ft).

The bridge connects the Prague districts Holešovice and the Old Town (Staré Město). The bridge is constructed of stone (pillars) and iron (arches). Up to 1961 the roadway was made of wood – a hard species named jarrah from Australia. The road got slippery in the rain, so it was paved for safety reasons.

The bridge's architects were Jan Koula and Jiří Soukup. Art Nouveau style sculptures (including four put on 17.5-m-high pylons) were created by sculptors Klusáček, Wurzel, Popp and Amort.

The bridge was named after Czech writer Svatopluk Čech who died around the time of the bridge's completion (1846–1908); its opening became a feat of the Czech nation. During the occupation of Czechoslovakia by Nazis, the name of the bridge was changed (1940–1945) to Mendel Bridge (Mendelův most), after Gregor Mendel (of German ethnicity).

In 1971–1975, Svatopluk Čech Bridge went through major reconstruction, in 1953–1956 and 2000–2001 through smaller reconstructions. In 1984–1987 the sculptures were repaired.

As the only Art Nouveau style bridge in the Czech Republic, it is protected by the state as a cultural monument. It is used by trams, cars and pedestrians.

== Gallery ==
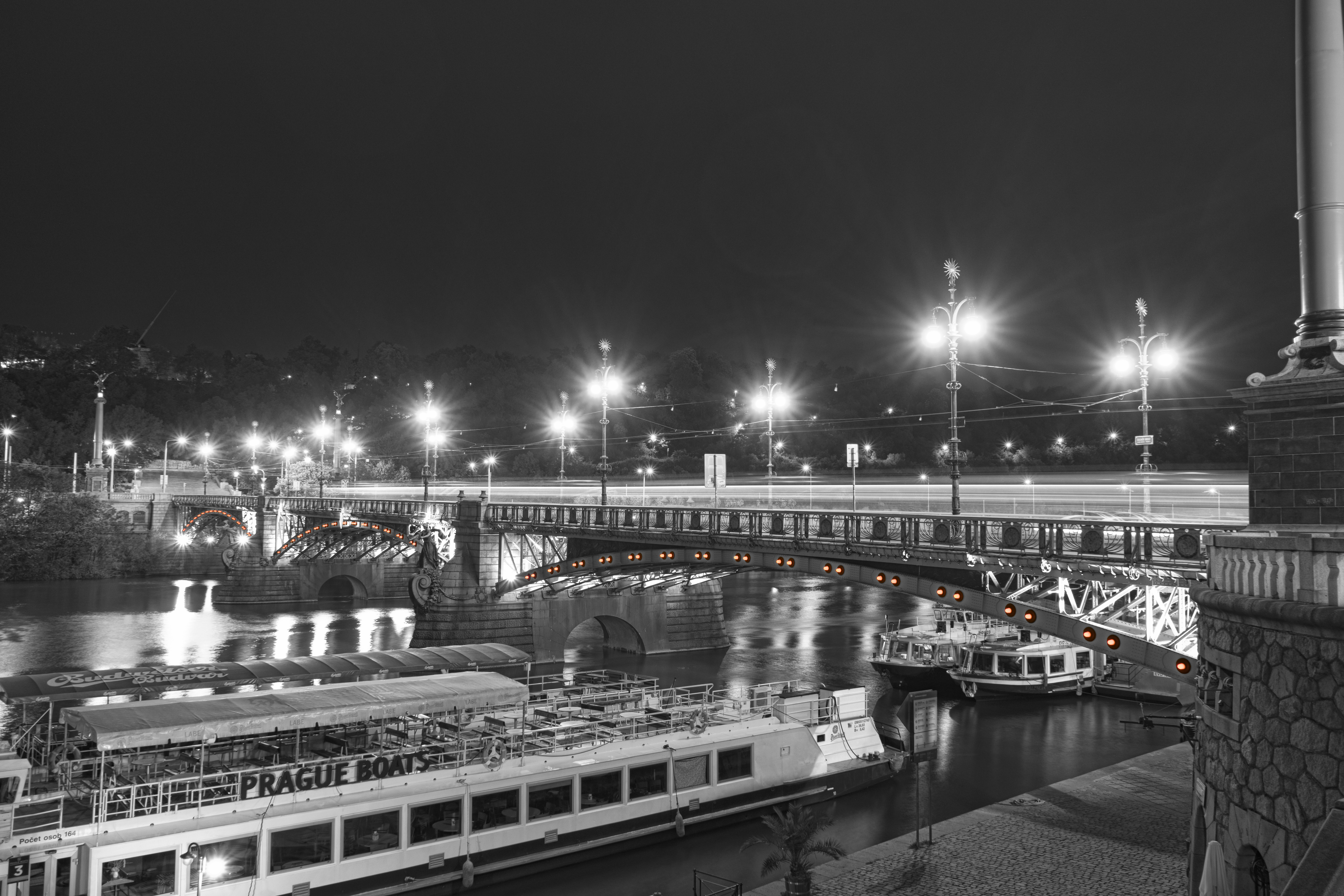
The Bridge at night in 2017

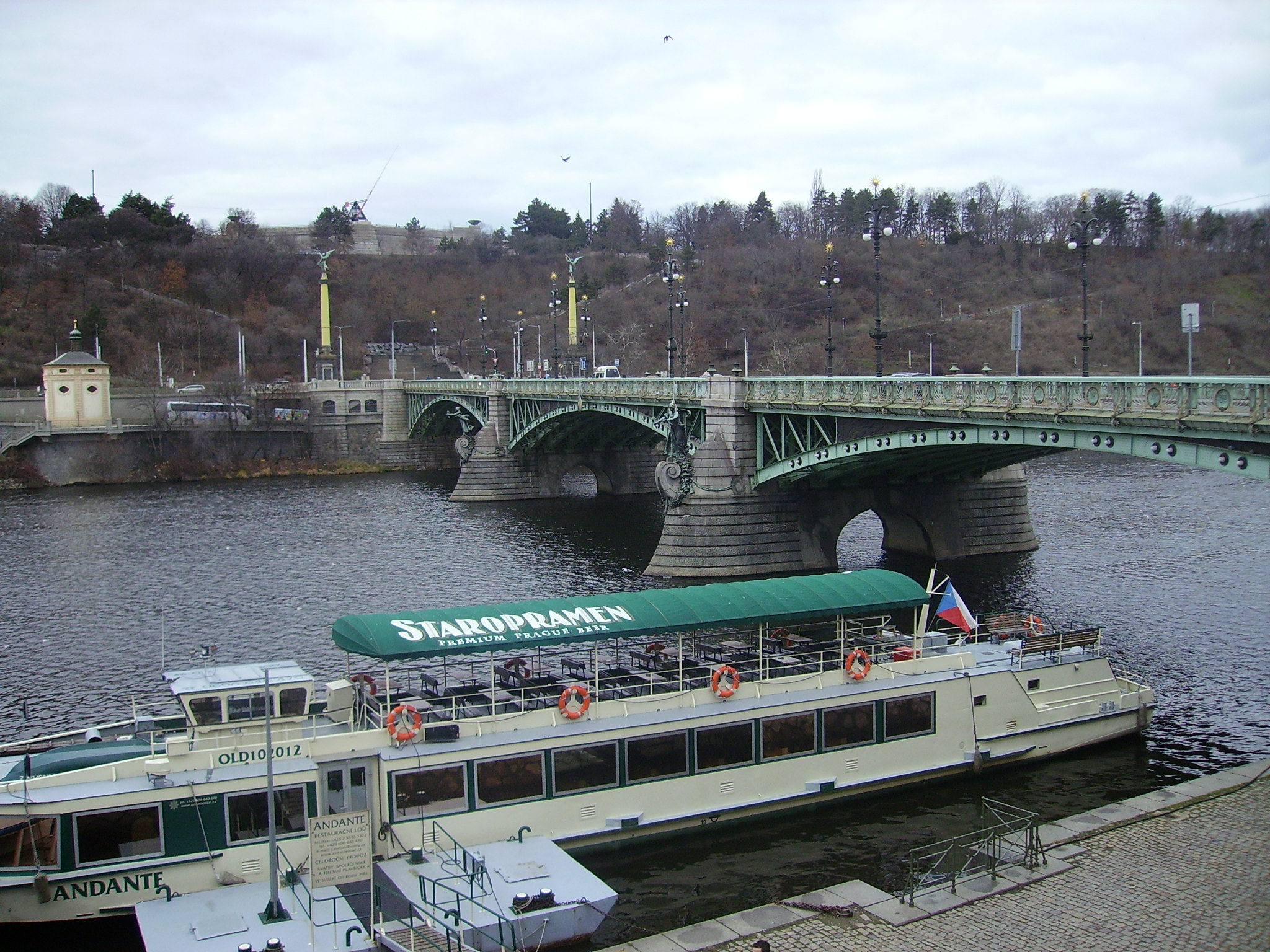
The bridge in 2007.

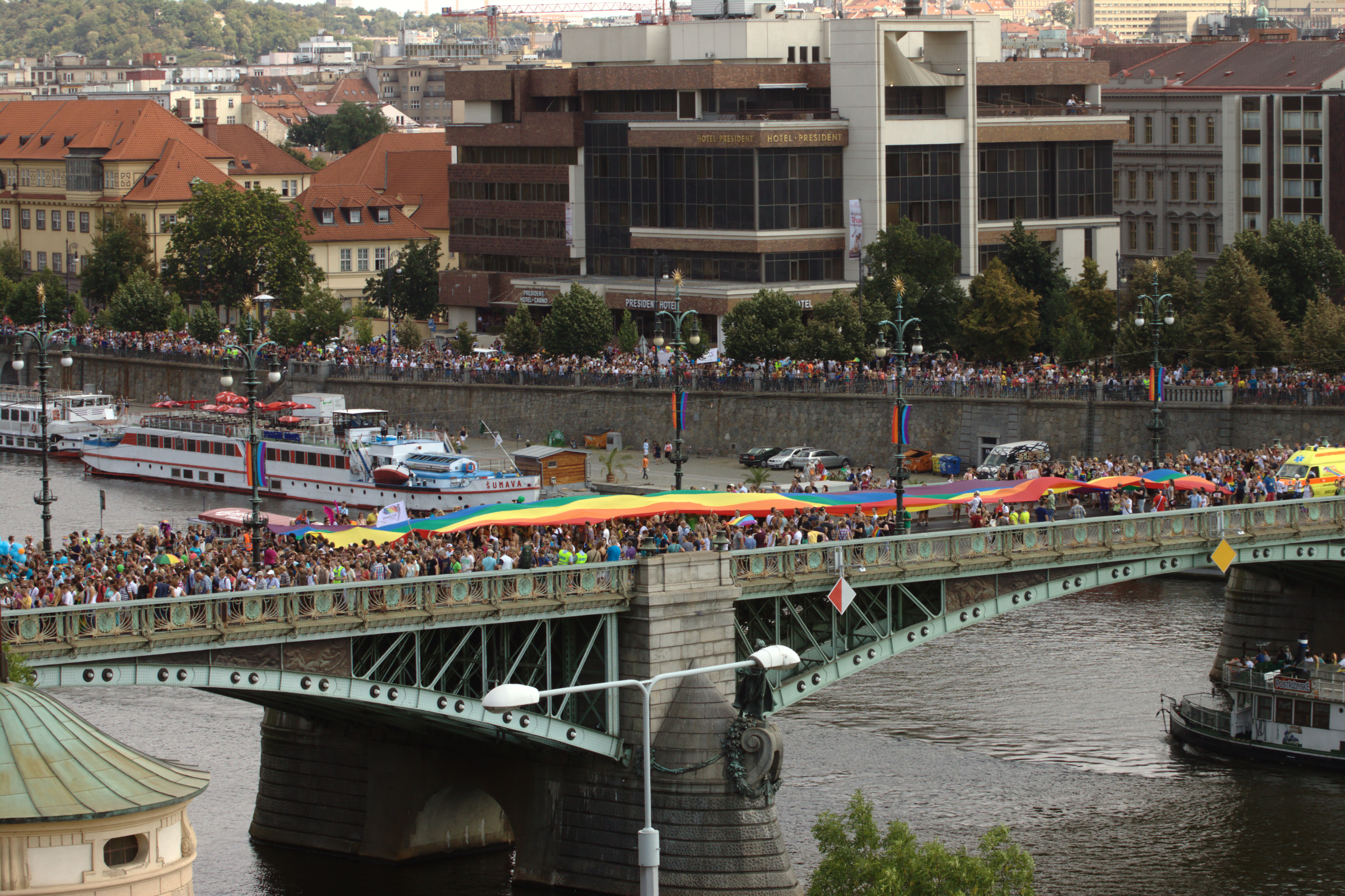
A Rainbow pride flag being carried across the Čechův bridge during the 2015 Prague Pride parade.

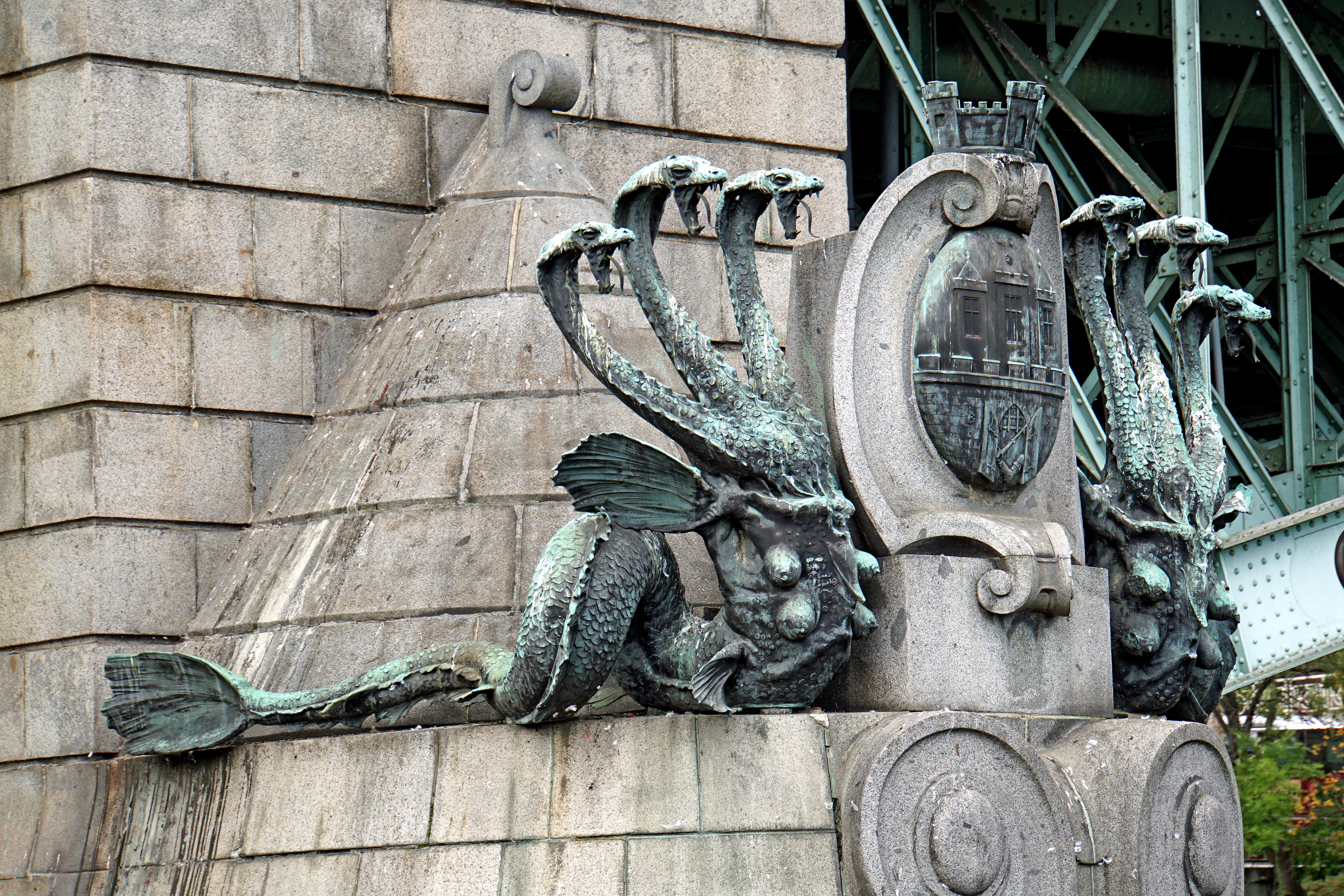
The down-stream side of the bridge with a six-headed hydra figure. 2016

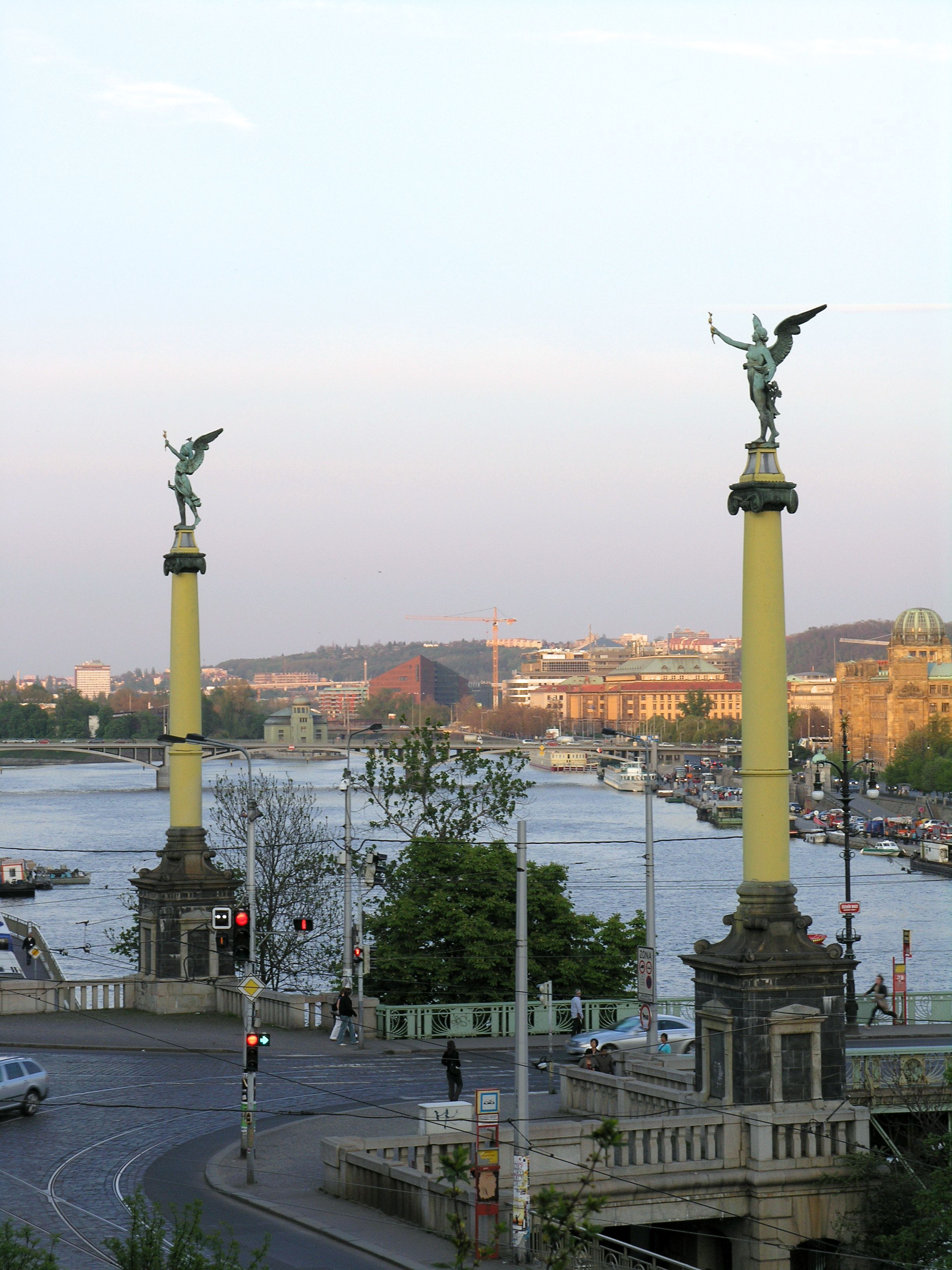
Columns with Geniuses on the bridge. 2008
