= Ana (programming language) =

Computer language for array processing

In contexts of solar physics and data analysis, Ana is a computer language that is designed for array processing and image data analysis. The name is an acronym for "A Non Acronym". Ana began as a fork of an early version of IDL, but has diverged significantly since then. It is particularly notable for being the only known fork of IDL from its early days as a quasi-open-source software package.

Ana was used as early as 1989 to track solar granulation using the SOUP instrument on Spacelab, and by the late 1990s it was in common use at the Lockheed-Martin Space Applications Laboratory and at other institutions that analyzed data from the TRACE spacecraft; it was never commonly used outside the community of active solar physics researchers, but represents a significant step forward in data analysis tools in that era. Ana was ultimately used to implement several important data visualization tools that advanced the state of the art, in the late 1990s—notably a multispectral image viewer that was used for several space missions including Yohkoh, SOHO, TRACE, and Hinode. Ana appears to have been intended as free software though it is not distributed under a recognized FOSS license. It remains available as source code, primarily through the Solarsoft distribution system, but its role as an open source, reproducible data analysis language has been subsumed by more recent tools such as PDL and Numpy/Astropy.
