= Solarsoft =

Solarsoft is a collaborative software development system created at Lockheed-Martin to support solar data analysis and spacecraft operation activities. It is widely recognized in the solar physics community as having revolutionized solar data analysis starting in the early 1990s. Solarsoft is in active development and use by research groups on all seven continents.

Solarsoft is a store-and-forward system that makes use of rsync, csh and other UNIX tools to distribute the software to a wide variety of platforms. Solarsoft predates CVS and most other collaborative development systems; hence, it does not provide direct support for many features that today would be considered necessary, such as software versioning. The use of Solarsoft has grown to include calibration data and even complete catalog indices for some instruments, as well as the scientific software.

Most of the software in the Solarsoft tree pertains to either solar data analysis or specific space missions or observatories such as Yohkoh or SOHO. The vast majority is written in IDL, the most commonly used analysis platform in the solar physics community, though some C, ana, and PDL modules are also available.
