= Autoloader (disambiguation) =

An autoloader is a mechanical aid or replacement for the personnel that load ordnance into crew-served weapons, such as tanks and artillery.

Autoloader may also refer to:

- A jargon term for a self-loading firearm.
- Autoloader (data storage device), sometimes called a stacker or a jukebox, a data storage device containing multiple media units that can be automatically loaded into the drive.
- A system to autoload parts of a computer program on demand instead of defining them explicitly
- A fictional magazine featured in the Punisher MAX imprint
- Autoload — a feature in some programming languages
