= Transgender flag =

Flag used by the transgender community

- Use: Symbol of the transgender community
- Adopted: 1999
- Design: Five horizontal stripes equally sized colored with two light blue, two pink, and a white stripe in the center
- Designed by: Monica Helms

The transgender flag, also called the transgender pride flag, or trans flag for short, is used by people, organizations and communities to represent pride, diversity, rights and/or remembrance within the transgender community. Its usage is similar to the original rainbow flag but specific to the transgender community.

It was designed in 1999 by Monica Helms and has since been adopted by the transgender community around the world.

The design features five horizontal stripes of three colors in the order light blue, pink, white, pink, and light blue. There are related flags as well, including ones which combine the "progress" version of the rainbow flag with the transgender and intersex flags, as well as various flags for niches within the transgender and non-binary communities.

Beyond the common transgender flag design, some artists have created alternative designs used by their local communities.

== History and design ==
The flag was created by American trans woman Monica Helms in 1999, and was first shown at a pride parade in Phoenix, Arizona, in 2000. Helms got the idea after talking with a friend, Michael Page, who had designed the bisexual flag the year prior.

Helms describes the meaning of the transgender pride flag as follows:

The stripes at the top and bottom are light blue, the traditional color for baby boys. The stripes next to them are pink, the traditional color for baby girls. The stripe in the middle is white, for those who are intersex, transitioning or consider themselves having a neutral or undefined gender.

On 19 August 2014, Monica Helms donated the original transgender pride flag to the Smithsonian National Museum of American History.

In 2019, 20 years after the creation of the flag, Helms published a memoir, More than Just a Flag, in which she noted how surprised she was at the adoption of her flag:

The speed with which the flag’s usage spread never fails to surprise me, and every time I see it, or a photo of it, flying above a historic town hall or building I am filled with pride.

=== Notable appearances featuring the transgender flag ===
In 2010 the Brighton and Hove, UK, council flew this flag on the Transgender Day of Remembrance. Transport for London also flew the flag from London Underground's 55 Broadway Headquarters for the 2016 Transgender Awareness Week.

The flag was flown in San Francisco's Castro District (where a rainbow flag usually flies) on 19 and 20 November 2012 in commemoration of the Transgender Day of Remembrance. The flag-raising ceremony was presided over by local drag queen La Monistat.

Philadelphia became the first county government in the US to officially raise the transgender pride flag in 2015. It was raised at City Hall in honor of Philadelphia's 14th Annual Trans Health Conference, and remained next to the US and City of Philadelphia flags for the entirety of the conference. Then-Mayor Michael Nutter gave a speech in honor of the trans community's acceptance in Philadelphia.

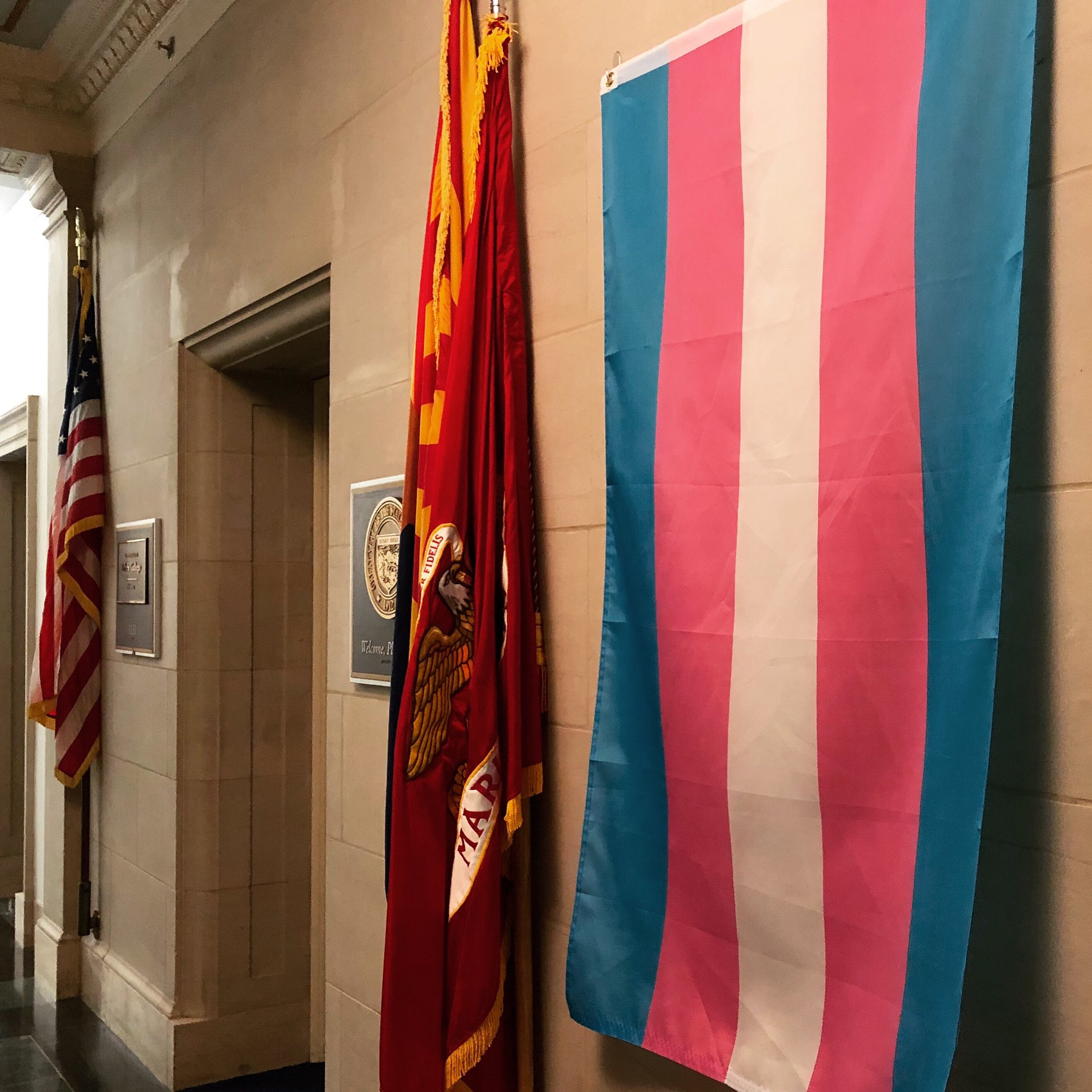
Transgender flag hanging out front of Congressmember Ruben Gallego's office at the United States Capitol in 2019

In January 2019, Virginia Representative Jennifer Wexton hung the transgender pride flag outside her office in Washington, D.C., in a move to show support for the transgender community. In March 2019, dozens of Democratic and independent members of Congress flew the flag outside their offices for Trans Visibility Week leading up to the International Transgender Day of Visibility.

The flag flew above US state capitol buildings for the first time on Transgender Day of Remembrance 2019. The Iowa State Capitol and California State Capitol displayed the flag.

In 2023, the Progress Pride flag, which incorporates the colors of the transgender flag was flown at the White House.

In the 2024 Eurovision Song Contest, non-binary Irish musician Bambie Thug wore an outfit featuring the colors of the transgender flag for their semi-final performance to raise awareness and representation for the non-binary and transgender community.

=== Transgender flags at LGBTQIA+ pride events ===
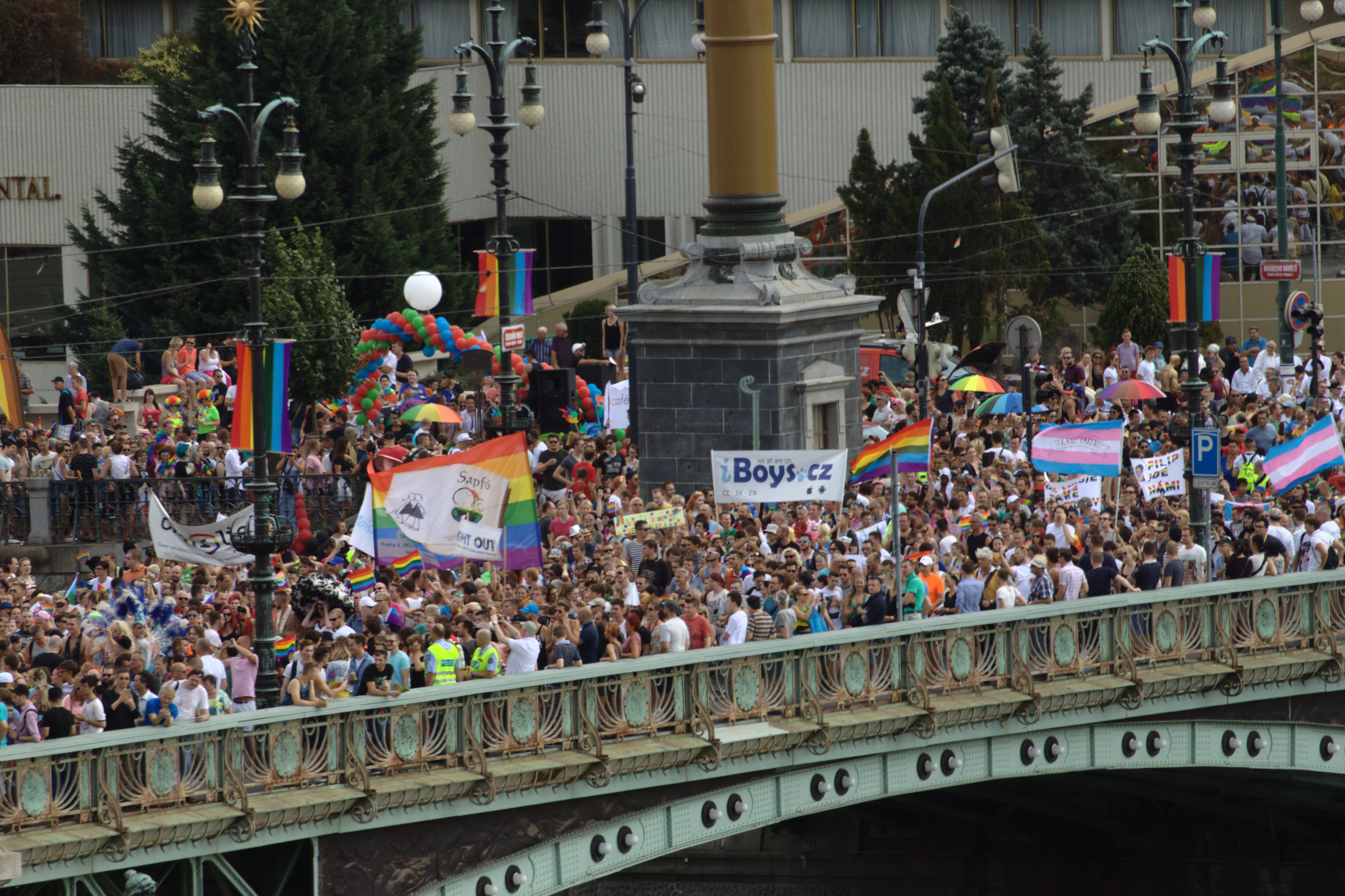
Transgender flags at the Prague Pride parade. The parade is crossing the Čechův Bridge, 2015.

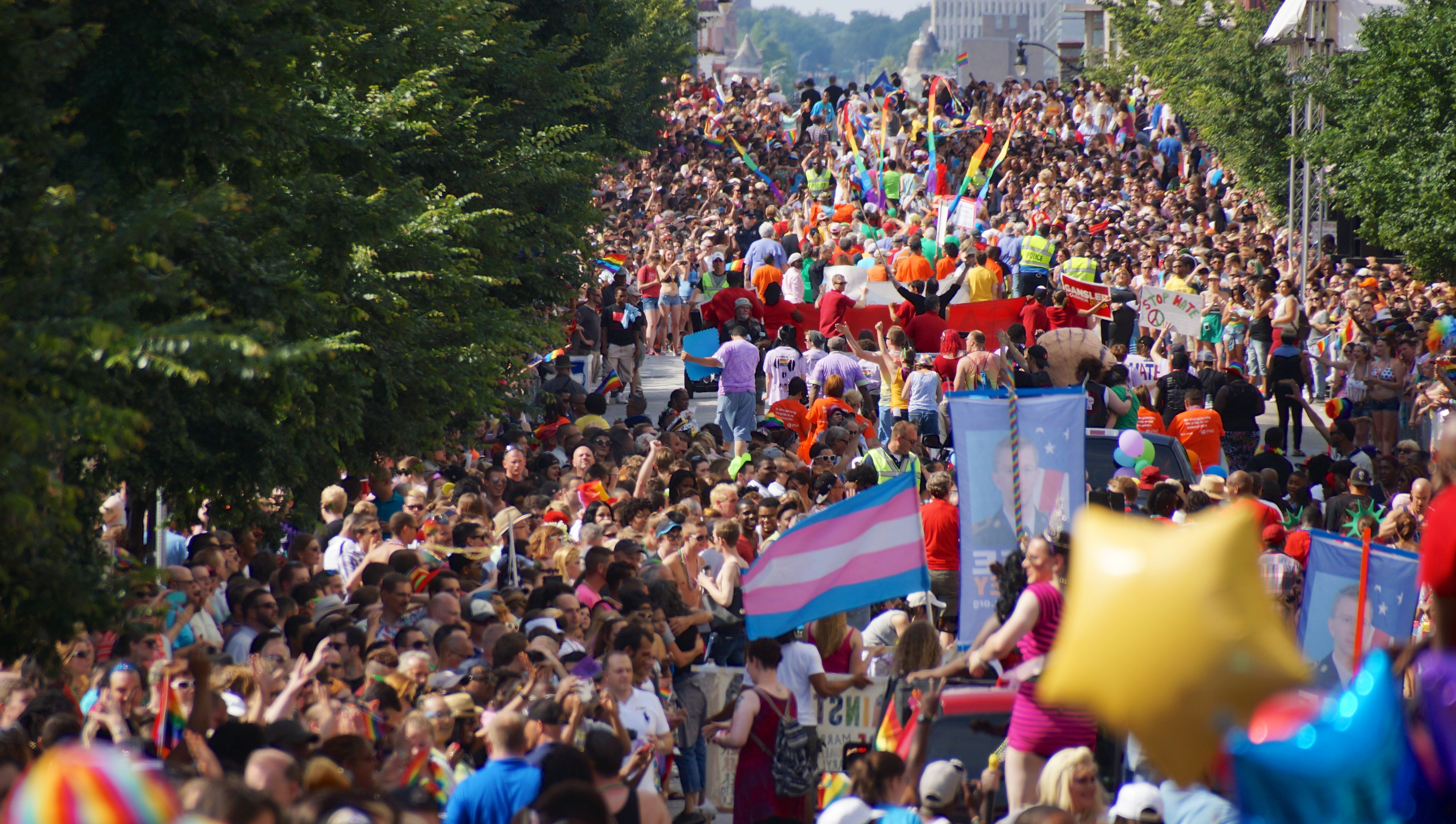
Transgender flag at the Baltimore Pride parade 2013.

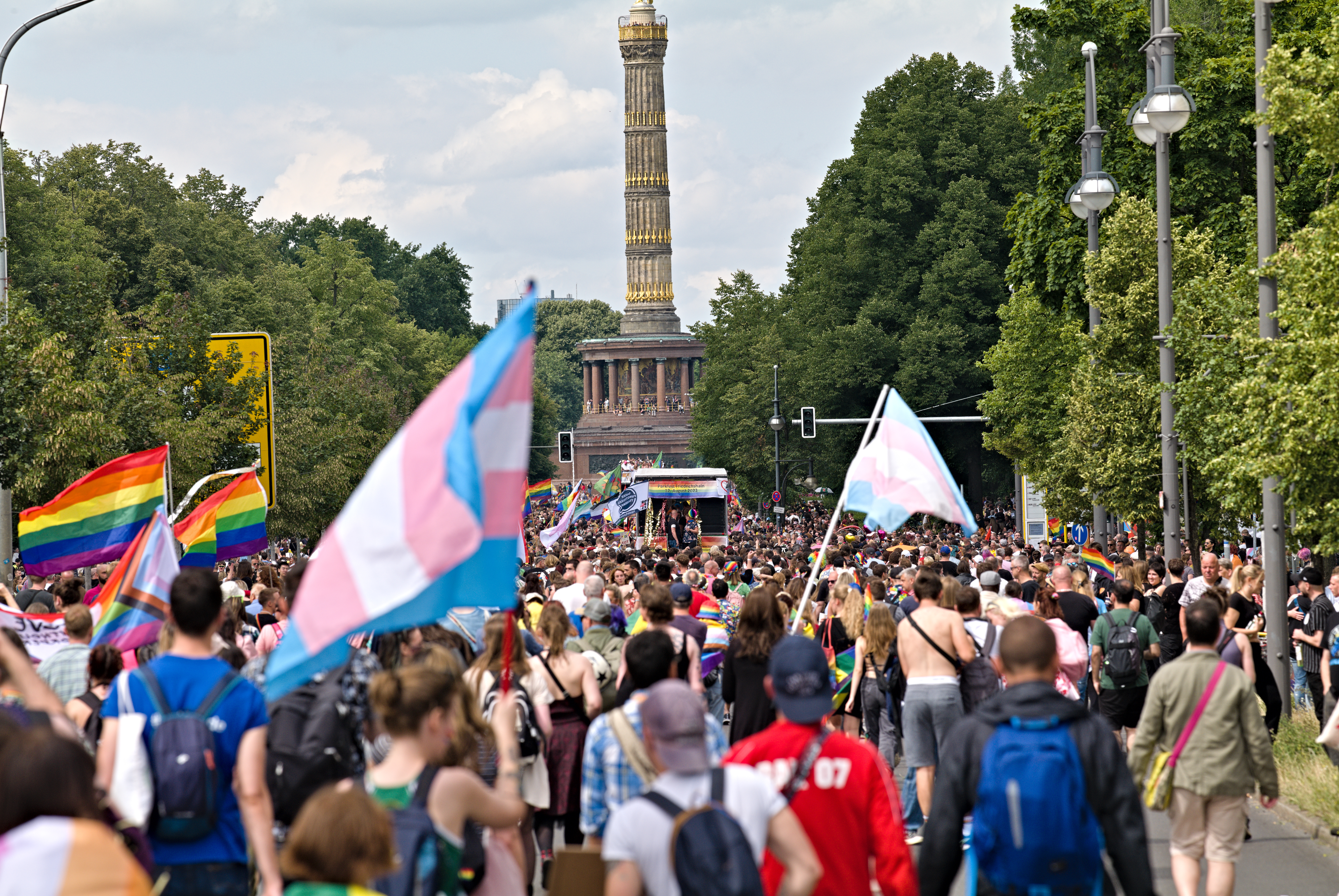
Transgender flags at the Christopher Street Day parade in Berlin on Helmut Kohl Avenue, 2023.

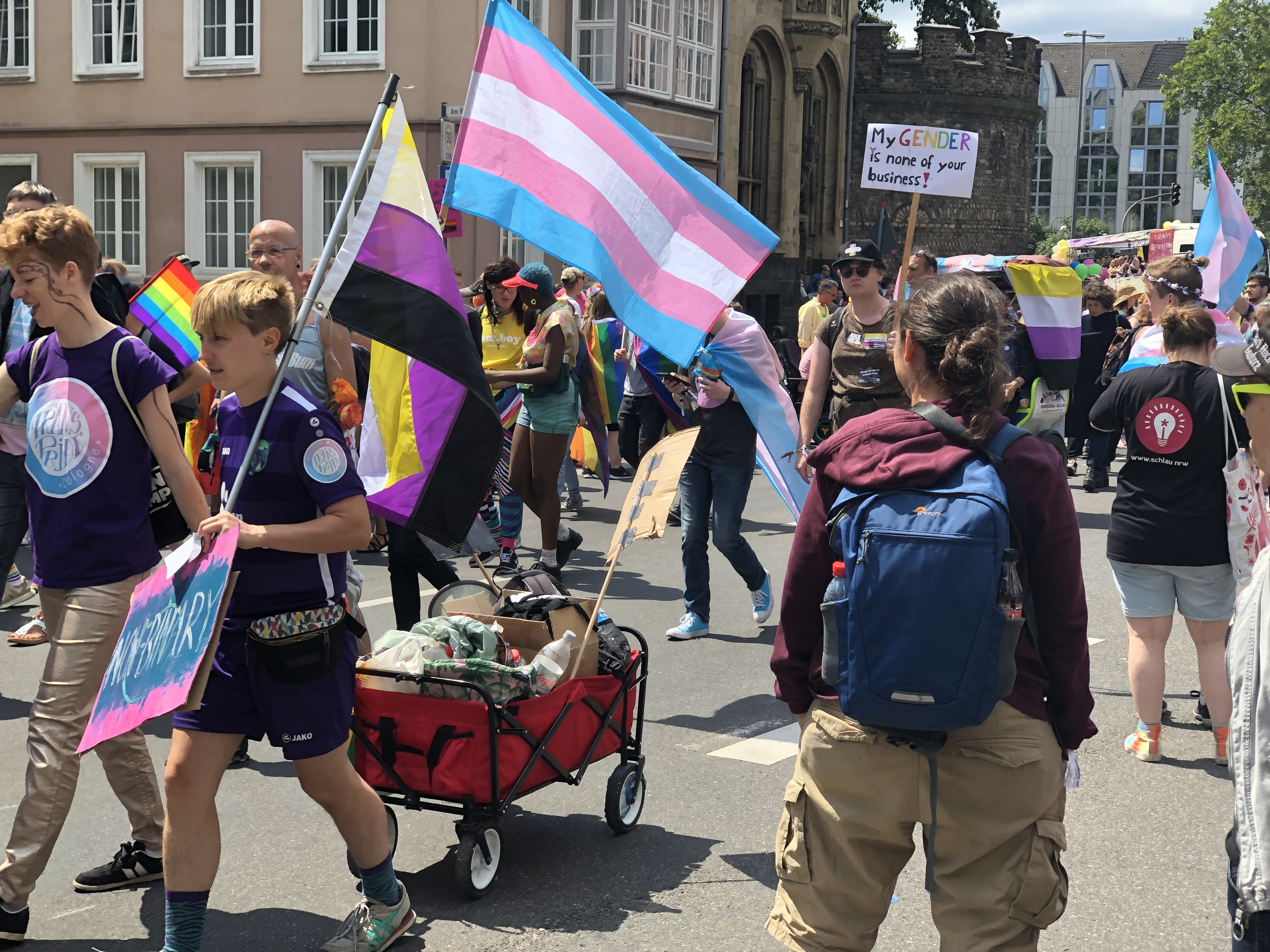
Transgender flags and Non-binary flags at the Christopher Street Day parade in Cologne, 2019

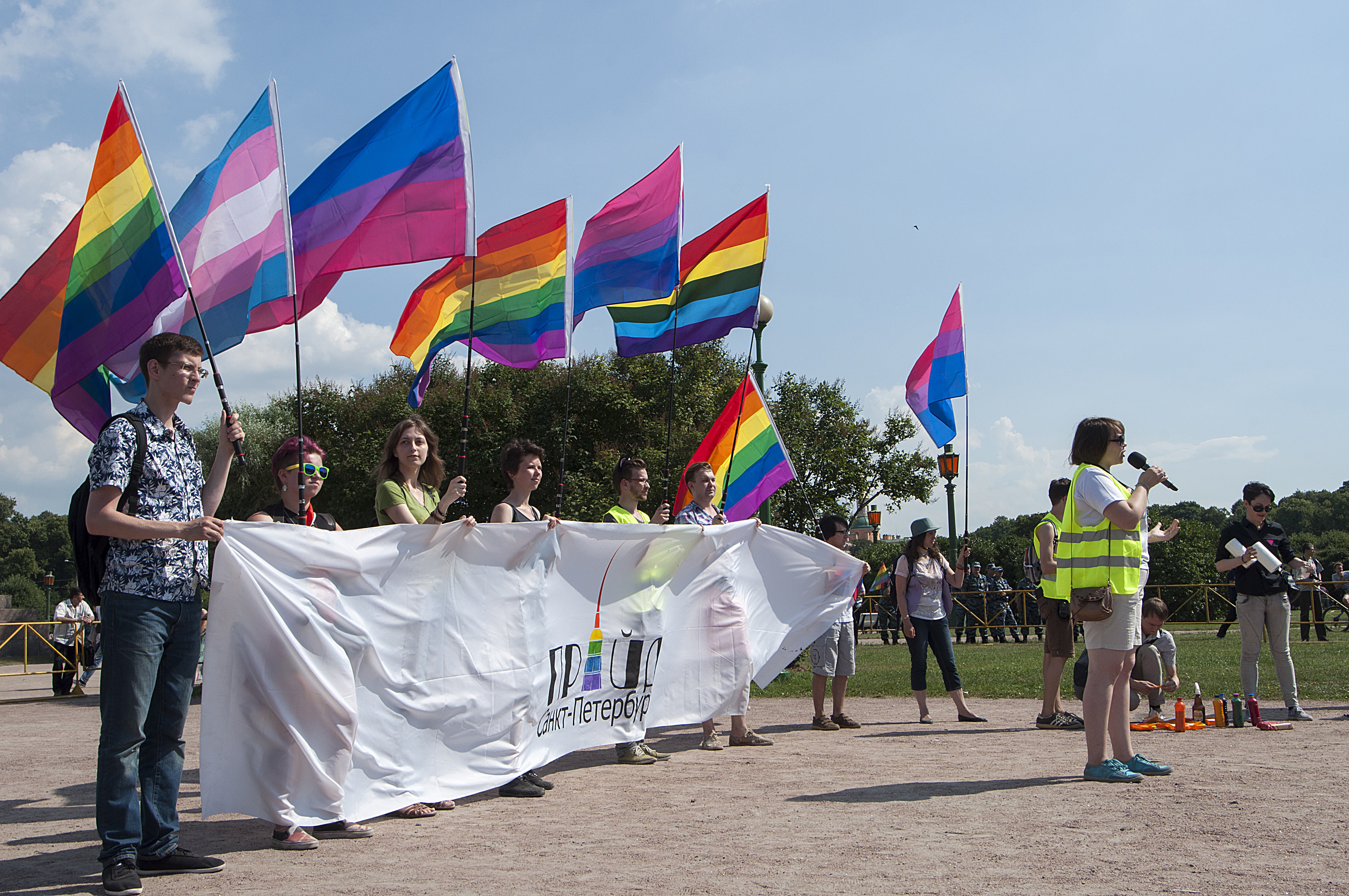
Transgender flag at a rally for the fifth St. Petersburg Gay Pride, held in the Field of Mars, Saint Petersburg, 2014.

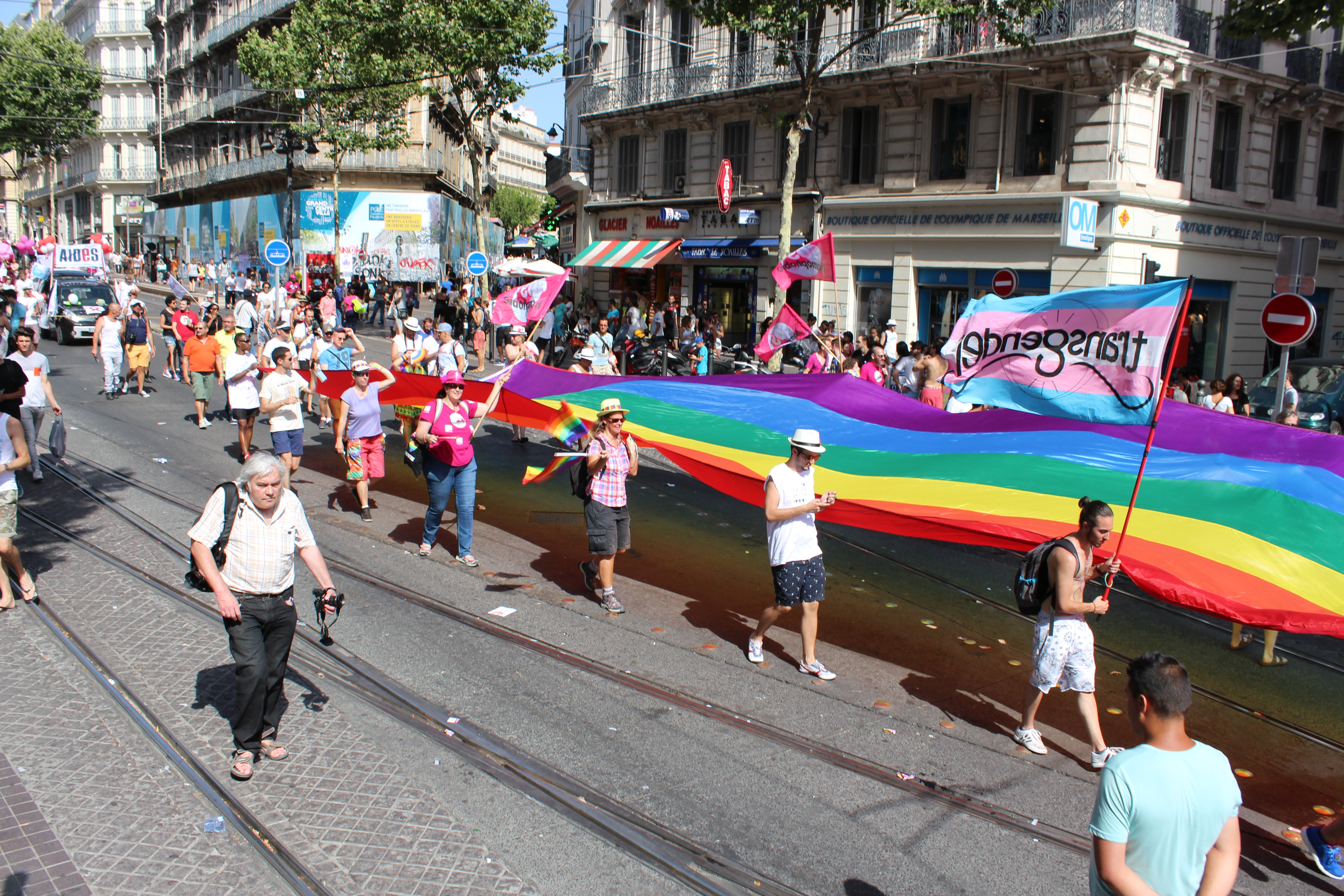
Transgender flag at the Marseille Pride parade 2015.

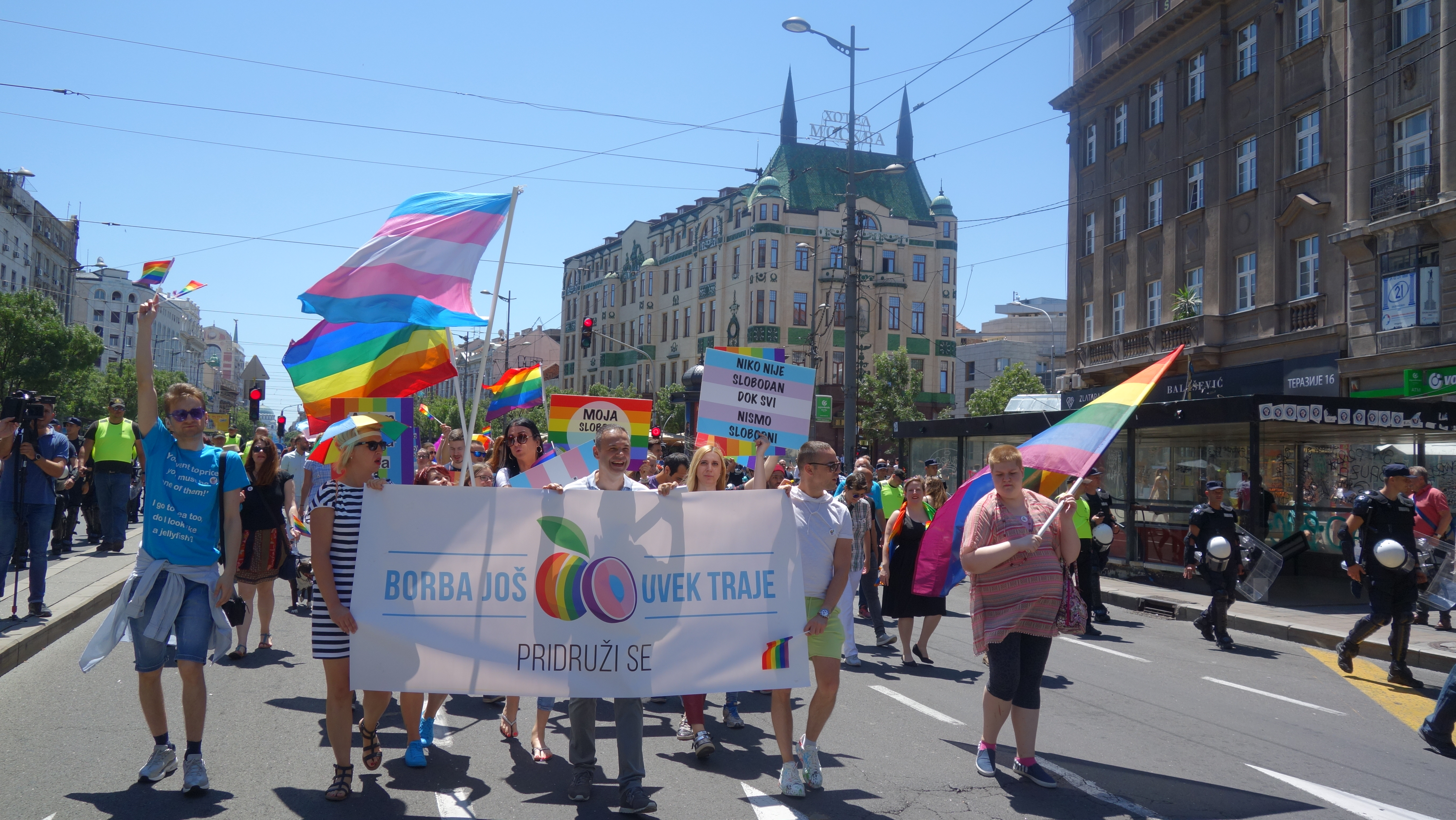
Transgender flag at the Belgrade Pride parade 2019.

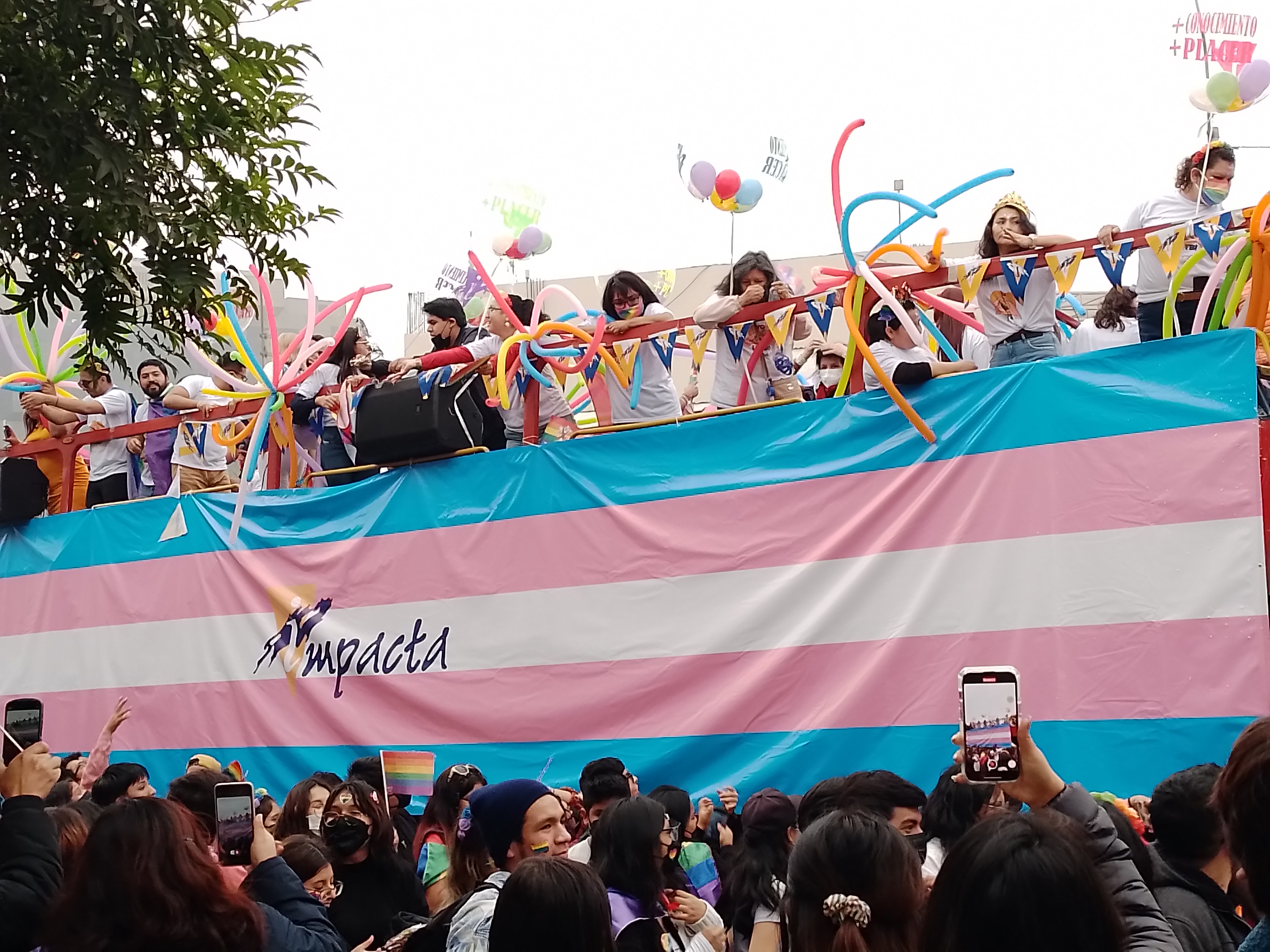
Transgender flag at the Lima pride parade 2022.

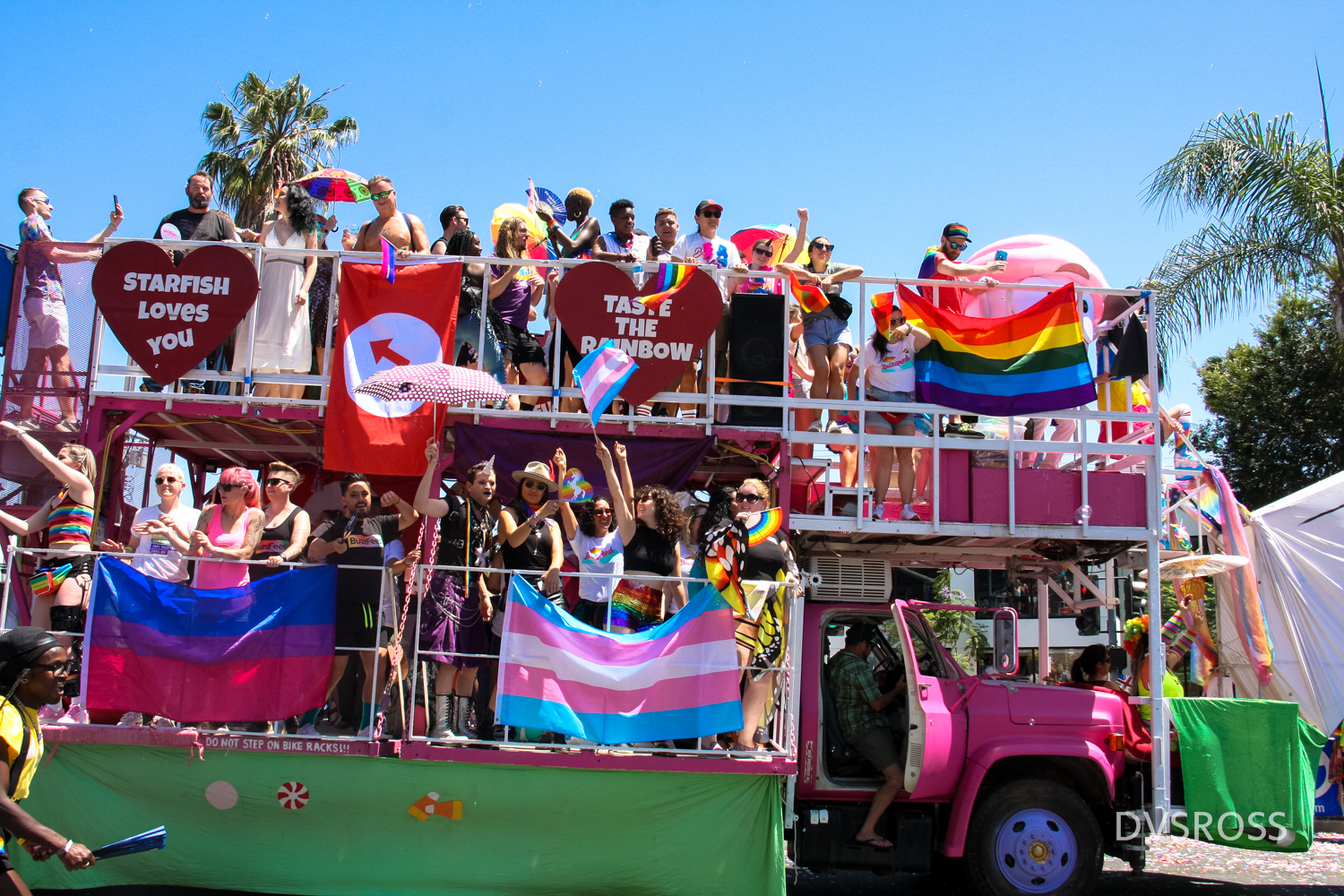
Transgender flag at the Los Angeles Pride parade 2019.

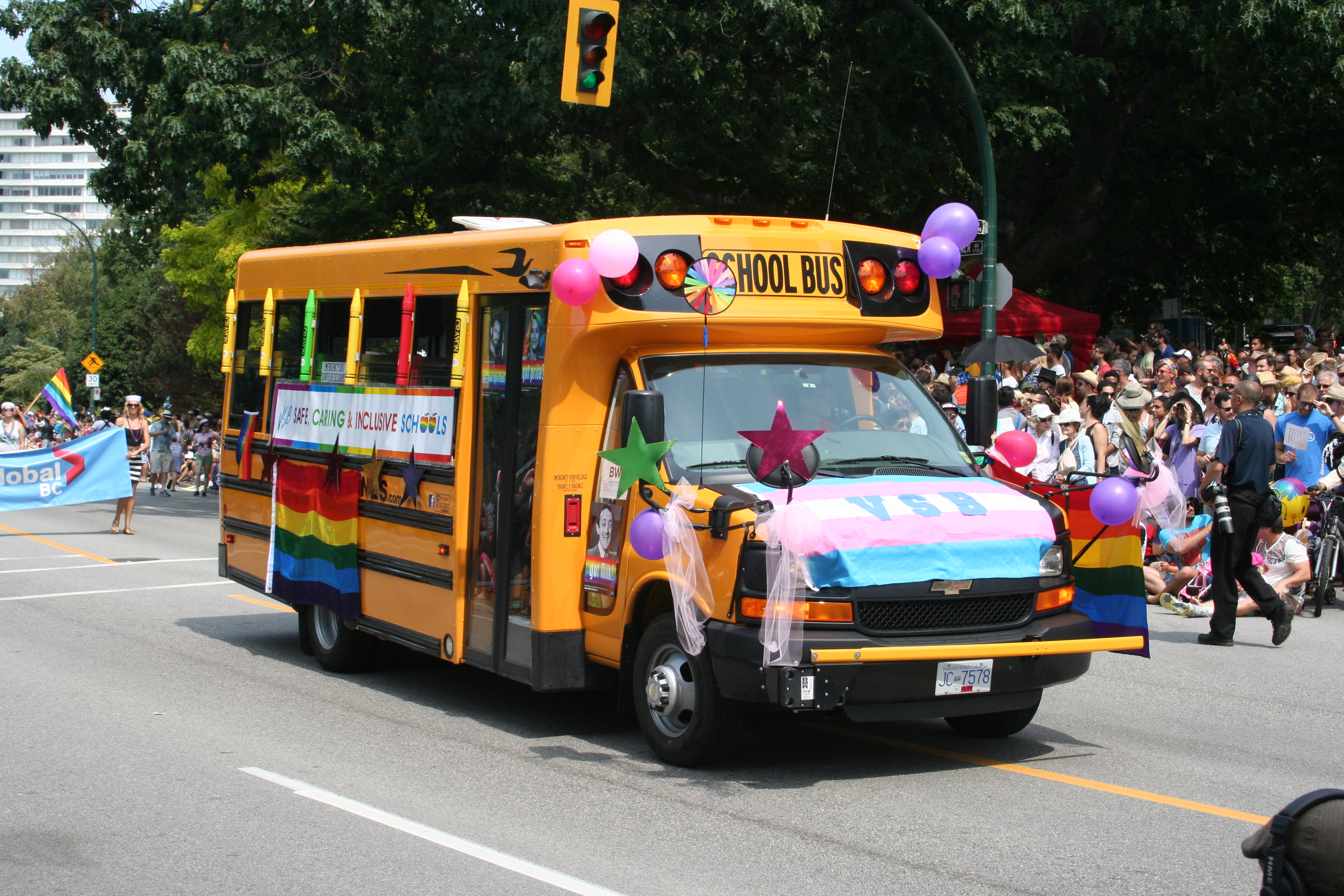
Transgender flag on the side of a school bus in the Vancouver Pride parade 2015.

=== Emoji ===
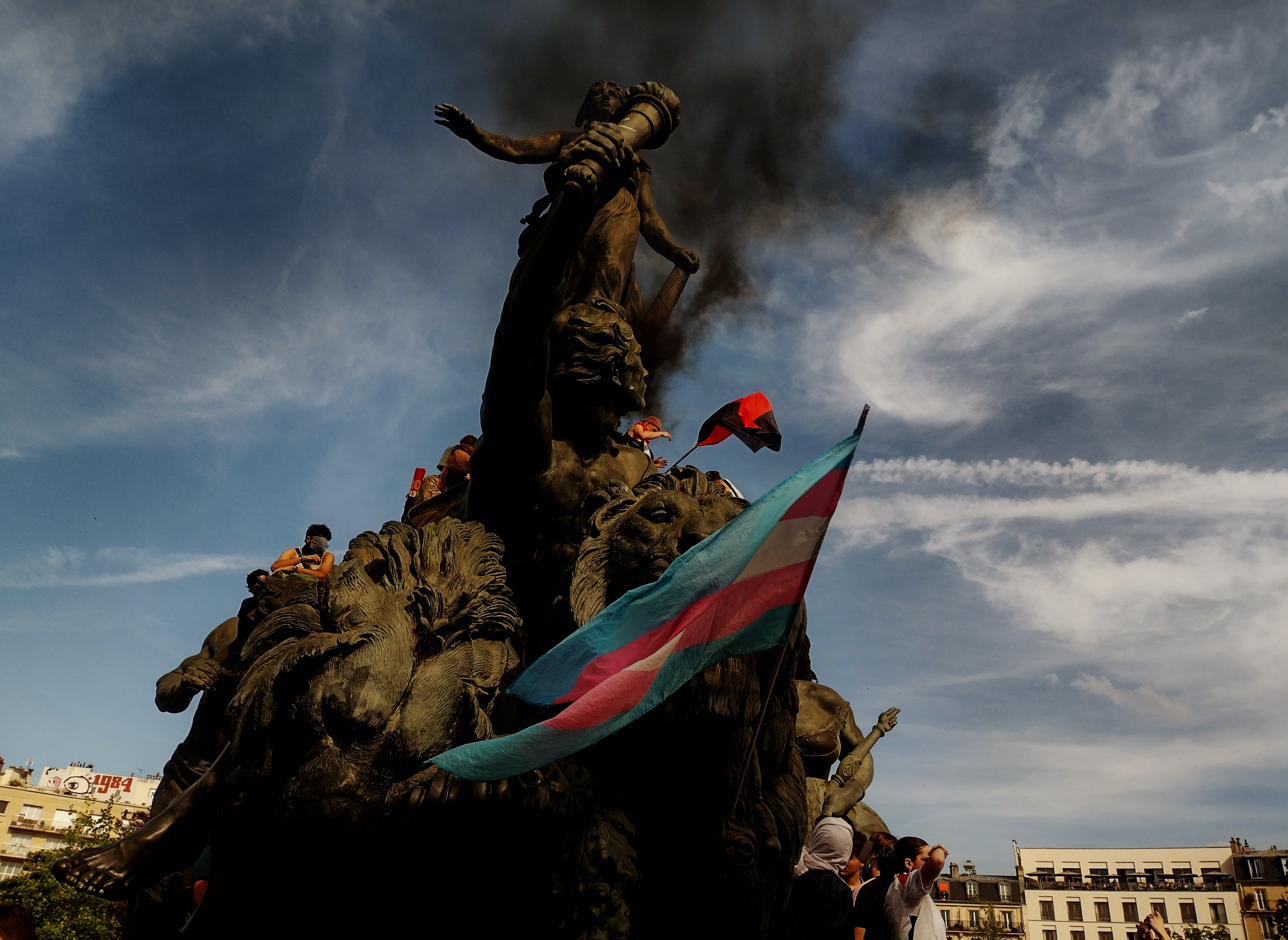
Red and black and trans flags on Le Triomphe de la République in Paris (1 May 2025).

When the Unicode Consortium announced in 2018 that they would be adding a lobster emoji to their list, activist Charlie Craggs began a campaign to "hijack" the lobster emoji as a transgender symbol and push for the inclusion of a transgender flag emoji as well. The Consortium added a transgender flag emoji in 2020, adopting Helms' design. The transgender flag emoji (🏳️‍⚧️) consists of a sequence of five Unicode code points: U+1F3F3 🏳 WAVING WHITE FLAG, U+FE0F ️ VARIATION SELECTOR-16, U+200D ZERO WIDTH JOINER, U+26A7 ⚧ MALE WITH STROKE AND MALE AND FEMALE SIGN, U+FE0F ️ VARIATION SELECTOR-16.

=== Other ===
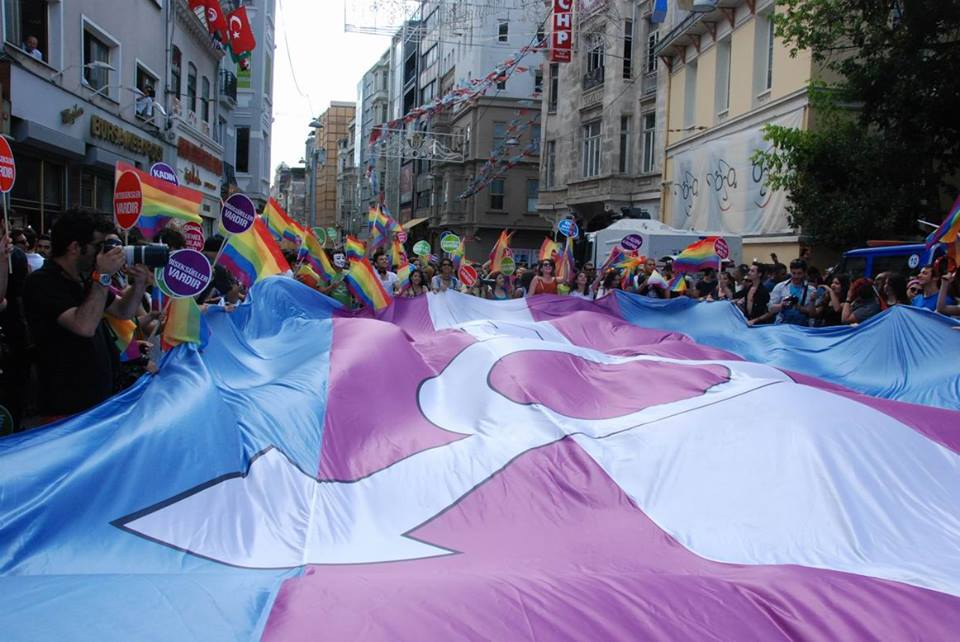
The Transgender pride flag at the Pride March held as part of the events for the 22nd Istanbul Pride Week, 2014.

In 2022 a transgender pride tartan "Based on the colours of the Transgender Flag" was registered with the Scottish Register of Tartans.

=== Variations ===
In addition to Helms's original transgender pride flag design, a number of communities have created their variation on the flag, adding symbols or elements to reflect aspects of transgender identity, such as the overlaying of other symbols such as the transgender symbol (⚧) designed by Holly Boswell, Wendy Parker, and Nancy R. Nangeroni.

A notable variation is the Progress Pride Flag, designed in 2018 by Daniel Quasar, which incorporates the three colors of the transgender flag designed by Helms, alongside two black and brown stripes to represent marginalized people of color and those living with AIDS into the rainbow flag.

In May 2025 the Salt Lake City, Utah city council approved mayor Erin Mendenhall's designs for three new city flags, one being the Sego Belonging Flag, based on the Progress Pride Flag, and another being the Sego Visibility Flag, based on the transgender pride flag. The two flags are identical to the flags they were based on, except for the addition of a sego lily in the canton. The flags were adopted in response to a new state law restricting the flying of the flags they were based on.

Variations on the transgender pride flag

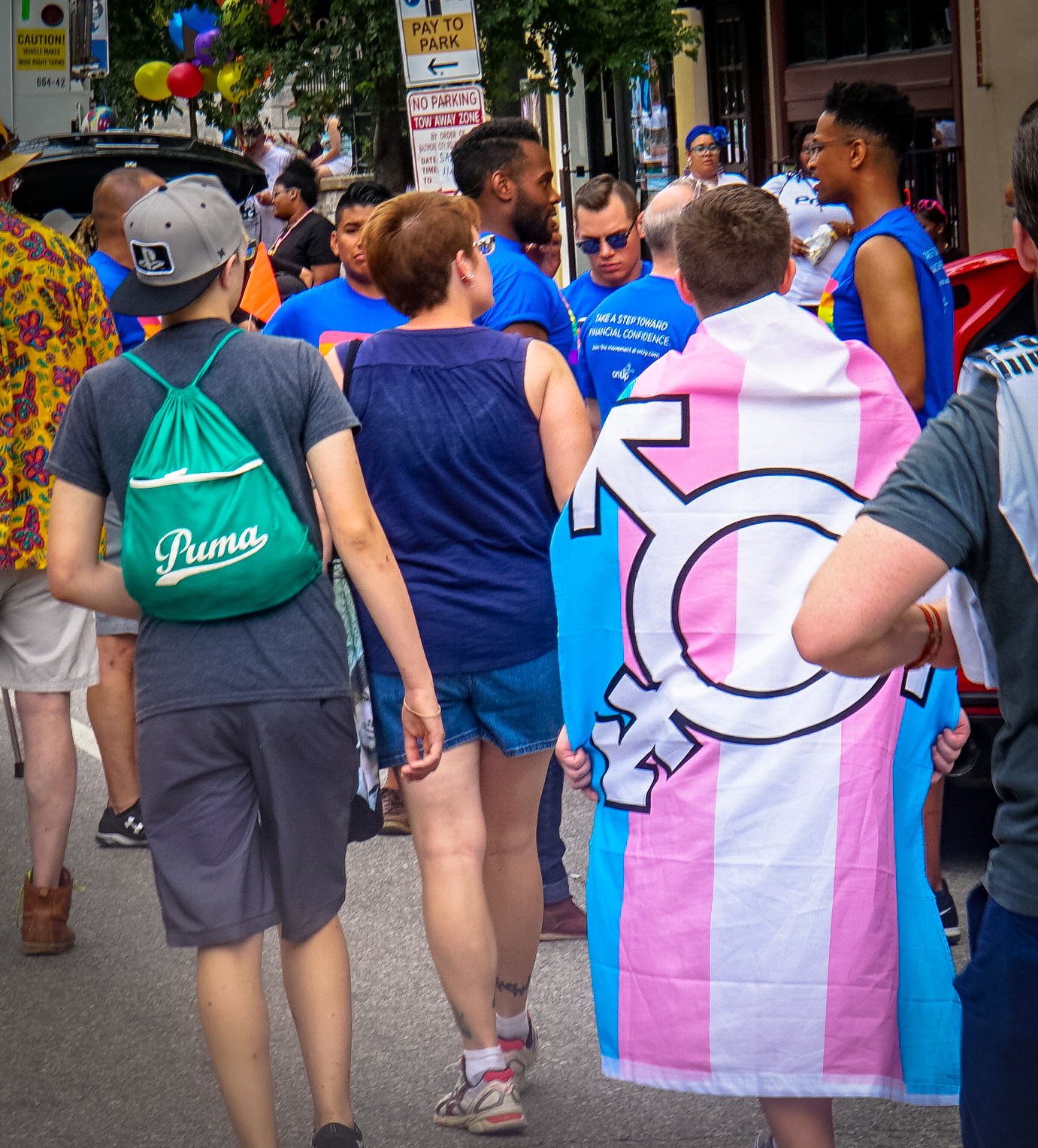
Transgender symbol (⚧) overlaid on the transgender flag

The Progress Pride Flag, designed in 2018 by Daniel Quasar

The Sego Belonging Flag, based on the Progress Pride Flag

The Sego Visibility Flag, based on the transgender pride flag

== Alternative designs ==
Besides the now most commonly used Helms design, which has become commonly known as the transgender flag, over the years some alternative transgender flags have been designed by artists.

=== Andrew design ===
In 1999, San Francisco trans man Johnathan Andrew, under the moniker of "Captain John" on his female-to-male trans website "Adventures in Boyland", designed and published a flag for those within the transgender community. This trans pride flag consists of seven stripes alternating in pink and light blue separated by thin white stripes and featuring, in the upper left hoist, a twinned Venus and Mars symbol in lavender. The repeated explanation of the color symbolism for Monica Helms's more well-known flag design is almost identical to that of the description of Andrew's design on other pages.

=== Pellinen design ===
Jennifer Pellinen designed this flag in 2002. The flag consists of five stripes from pink at the top to blue at the bottom. The pink and blue represent male and female, respectively, and the three purple stripes represent the diversity of the transgender community as well as genders other than male and female.

=== Israeli transgender flag ===
A different design is used in Israel by the transgender and genderqueer community. This flag has a neon green background to stand out in public places and protests, and a centered Venus, Mars, and Mars with stroke symbol in black to represent transgender people.

=== Lindsay design ===
In Ontario, a flag known as the "Trans Flag", created by Ottawa graphic designer Michelle Lindsay, is used. It consists of two stripes, the top in Sunset Magenta representing female, and the bottom in Ocean Blue representing male, with a tripled Venus, Mars, and Mars with stroke symbol representing transgender people, overlaying them.

This Trans Flag was first used by the Ottawa-area trans community for Ottawa's 2010 edition of the Trans Day of Remembrance. This event included a ceremony in which the Ottawa Police unveiled and raised this flag. The ceremony was repeated during the 2011 Ottawa and Gatineau editions of the Trans Day of Remembrance, this time joined by the Ottawa Paramedics, Ottawa City Hall and Gatineau City Hall also raising the Trans Flag during their own ceremonies. The list of groups doing official unfurling/raising of the Trans Flag in the Ottawa-Gatineau area as part of their Trans Day of Remembrance has grown each year. The Trans Flag has also been used as part of the Peterborough Pride Parade.

=== Kaleidoscope ===
In 2014, a new transgender flag known as the "Trans Kaleidoscope" was created by members of the Toronto Trans Alliance (TTA). It was raised at the first Transgender Day of Remembrance ceremony at Toronto City Hall on 20 November 2014. Controversially, TTA members voted for this flag rather than the Helms and Lindsay flags, which some felt did not represent them. The flag has not received significant usage since the event. The Trans Kaleidoscope is described on the TTA web site as representing "the range of gender identities across the spectrum", with the individual colours representing:

- Pink: women/femaleness
- Purple: those who feel their gender identity is a combination of "man" and "woman"; they may consider themselves bigender
- Green: those who feel their gender identity is neither "man" nor "woman"; they may consider themselves non-binary
- Blue: men/maleness
- Yellow: intersex

The new white symbol with a black border is an extension of the Trans symbol with the male and female symbols, a combined symbol representing those with a gender identity combining male and female and a plain pole (with neither arrow nor bar) representing those with a gender identity that is neither male nor female, embodying awareness and inclusion of all.

Alternative transgender pride flag designs

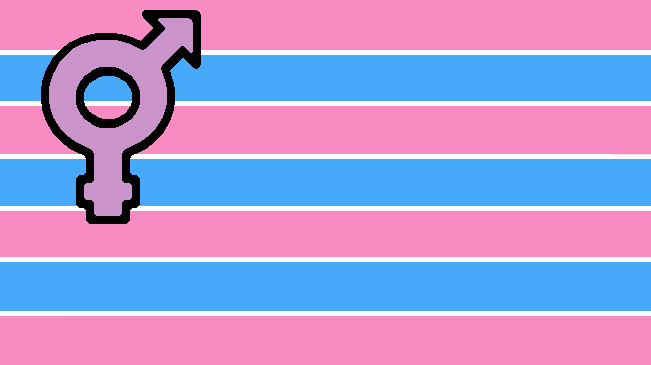
The transgender pride flag designed in 1999 by Johnathan Andrew

Jennifer Pellinen's transgender pride design

Israeli transgender and genderqueer flag

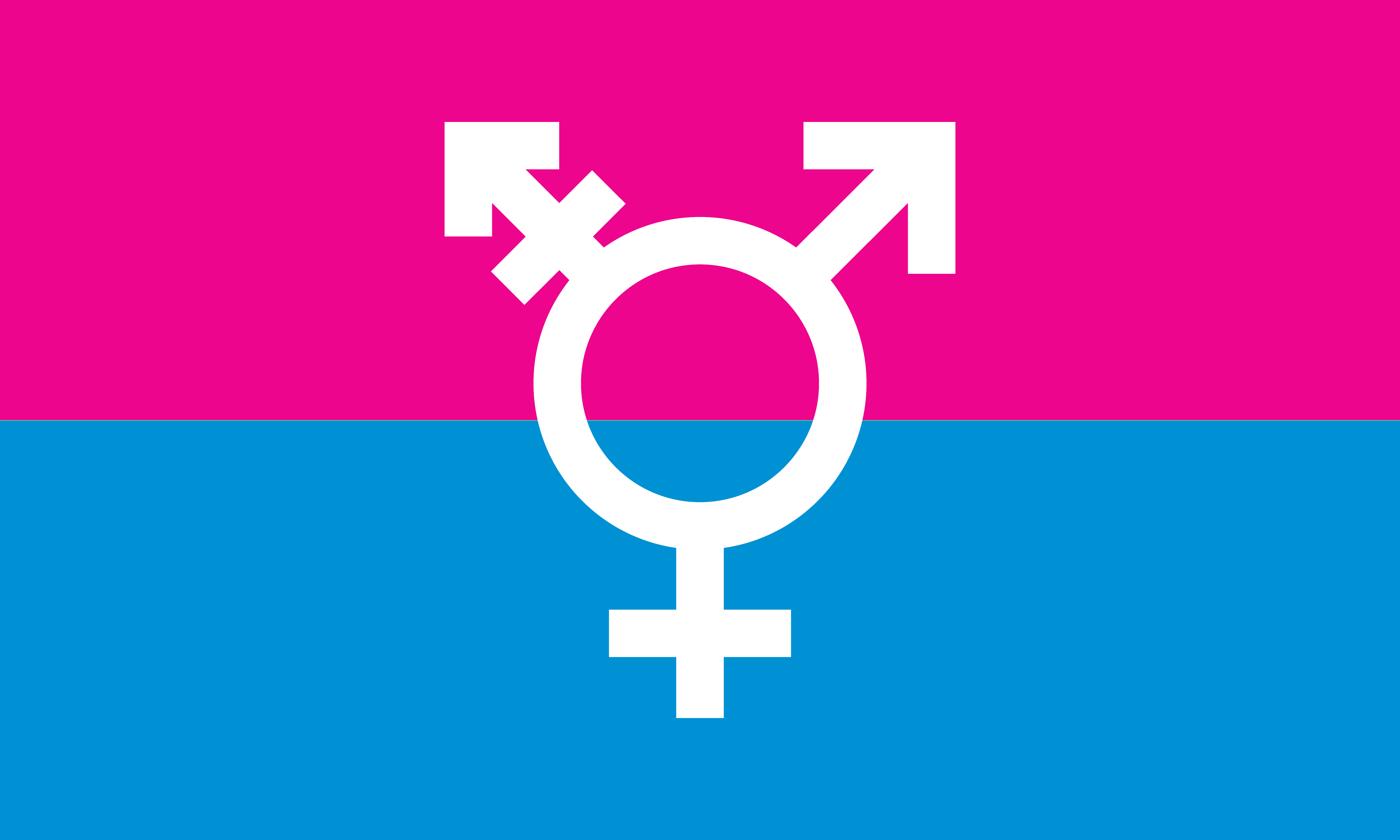
Michelle Lindsay's "Trans Flag" design

== See also ==
- Flag of Espírito Santo
- LGBTQ symbols
- List of transgender-related topics
- List of transgender-rights organizations
- Pride flag
- Transgender rights movement
