= Karl Glazebrook =

British astronomer (born 1965)

Karl Glazebrook (born 1965) is a British astronomer, known for his work on galaxy formation, for playing a key role in developing the "nod and shuffle" technique for doing redshift surveys with large telescopes, and for originating the Perl Data Language (PDL).

Glazebrook was born in 1965 in the United Kingdom, and educated at the University of Cambridge and the University of Edinburgh (PhD 1992). He held post-doctoral appointments at the University of Durham and University of Cambridge before moving to the Anglo-Australian Observatory, where he played a central role in supporting the 2dF galaxy survey as its instrument scientist. He moved to Johns Hopkins University in 2000 where he was Professor of Astronomy until 2006, at which time he became Professor of Astronomy at Swinburne University of Technology in Melbourne, Australia. His work has been cited over 40,000 times in the literature of astronomy.

Glazebrook also developed the open-source Perl Data Language, a perl-based alternative to the commercial IDL.

Glazebrook was one of the leaders of the Gemini Deep Deep Survey (GDDS) which measured the evolution of galaxies using Gemini Observatory and the Hubble and Spitzer Space Telescopes. The project, along with a number of other studies, determined in 2004 that massive galaxies formed surprisingly early in the distant Universe, explaining why a lot of them appear so remarkably old. As a whimsical side-project Glazebrook also determined that the bulk-averaged color of the Universe is cosmic latte. Both pieces of work received wide publicity in the international press. The bulk-averaged color earned some additional international publicity because a software bug had initially suggested a pale turquoise instead of the bland beige. He is also well known in the astronomical community for his pioneering work in developing the baryon oscillation technique to use the distribution of galaxies as a probe of dark energy.

After his move to Australia he played a leading role in the WiggleZ Dark Energy Survey between 2006 and 2011.

== Honours and awards ==
- 2018 Australian Laureate Fellowship
- 2008, awarded the Maria & Eric Muhlmann Award for the development of innovative research instruments and techniques from the Astronomical Society of the Pacific.
- Outer main-belt asteroid 10099 Glazebrook, discovered by Spacewatch at Kitt Peak in 1991, was named in his honor. Naming citation was published on 11 November 2000 (M.P.C. 41571).
