= GNU Data Language =

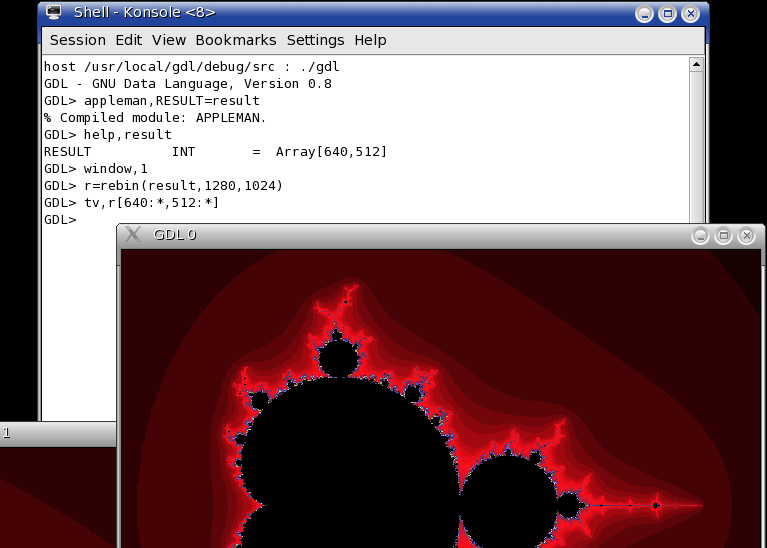
- GDL rendering the Mandelbrot set
- Developer: Marc Schellens
- Initial release: 2004; 22 years ago
- Stable release: 1.1.3 / 17 December 2025; 4 months ago
- Written in: C++ (wxWidgets)
- Operating system: Linux, macOS, Solaris, POSIX, Windows
- Type: Technical computing
- License: GNU GPL-2.0
- Website: gnudatalanguage.github.io
- Repository: github.com/gnudatalanguage/gdl

The GNU Data Language (GDL) is a free alternative to IDL (Interactive Data Language), achieving full compatibility with IDL 7 and partial compatibility with IDL 8. Together with its library routines, GDL is developed to serve as a tool for data analysis and visualization in such disciplines as astronomy, geosciences, and medical imaging. GDL is licensed under the GPL. Other open-source numerical data analysis tools similar to GDL include Julia, Jupyter Notebook, GNU Octave, NCAR Command Language (NCL), Perl Data Language (PDL), R, Scilab, SciPy, and Yorick.

GDL as a language is dynamically-typed, vectorized, and has object-oriented programming capabilities. GDL library routines handle numerical calculations (e.g. FFT), data visualisation, signal/image processing, interaction with host OS, and data input/output. GDL supports several data formats, such as NetCDF, HDF (v4 & v5), GRIB, PNG, TIFF, and DICOM. Graphical output is handled by X11, PostScript, SVG, or z-buffer terminals, the last one allowing output graphics (plots) to be saved in raster graphics formats. GDL features integrated debugging facilities, such as breakpoints. GDL has a Python bridge (Python code can be called from GDL; GDL can be compiled as a Python module). GDL uses the Eigen numerical library (similar to Intel MKL) to offer high computing performance on multi-core processors.

Packaged versions of GDL are available for several Linux and BSD flavours as well as macOS. The source code compiles on Microsoft Windows and other UNIX systems, including Solaris.

GDL is not an official GNU package.

== See also ==
- Interpreter (computing)
- IDL (programming language)
