= NB flag =

NB flag may refer to:

- Flag of New Brunswick
- Non-binary flag
