= NV5 Geospatial Solutions =

American scientific software company

NV5 Geospatial Software, Inc.
- Industry: Geospatial Software; Remote Sensing
- Founded: 1977
- Headquarters: Broomfield, Colorado, United States
- Website: www.nv5geospatialsoftware.com

NV5 Geospatial Software develops products for the visualization, analysis, and management of geospatial imagery and scientific data. The company develops products such as IDL, ENVI, Jagwire, and Helios which are used in a variety of industries including defense and intelligence, environmental, engineering, aerospace, medical imaging, federal and civil governments, precision agriculture and academia worldwide.

== History ==
The company's origin can be traced back to 1977 when David Stern was working at the University of Colorado on the Mariner Mars space probes. Stern developed a programming language called Mariner Mars Spectral Editor, which later evolved to IDL, Interactive Data Language, in order to supplement FORTRAN, specifically for data analysis and visualization. As his vision developed, Stern left the university and started working in his attic to improve the programming language. He incorporated Research Systems Inc. (RSI) and released IDL as a proprietary programming language for visualizing data. NASA Goddard Space Center and Ball Aerospace were among the company's early customers.

In 1994, the software package ENVI was released. Written in IDL, ENVI is the industry standard for image processing and analysis allowing GIS professionals, remote sensing scientists, and image analysts to extract information from geospatial imagery. RSI was acquired by Eastman Kodak as a wholly owned subsidiary in 2000. Four years later, RSI along with the Remote Sensing Systems division of Eastman Kodak, were sold to ITT Corporation and were renamed ITT Visual Information Solutions.

In 2011, ITT Corporation was divided into three standalone companies, and ITT Visual Information Solutions became part of Exelis Inc. along with ITT Defense and Information Solutions. ITT Visual Information Solutions was renamed again to the current Exelis Visual Information Solutions. Exelis Visual Information Solutions was purchased by Harris Corporation in 2015, becoming a subsidiary known as Harris Geospatial Solutions, Inc. In 2019, Harris Corporation merged with L3 Technologies, Inc. and became L3Harris Technologies, Inc. In 2023, NV5 Global, Inc. acquired L3Harris Geospatial Solutions, Inc., renaming it to NV5 Geospatial Software, Inc.

== Products ==
=== IDL ===
IDL (Interactive Data Language) is a scientific programming language used in particular areas of science, such as astronomy, meteorology, and medical imaging, to create meaningful visualizations out of complex numerical data.

=== ENVI ===
ENVI is an off-the-shelf software program used to visualize, process and analyze geospatial imagery.

=== Jagwire ===
Jagwire is a data ingest, management, image exploitation, and information dissemination tool.
