= Monica Helms =

American activist and writer (born 1951)

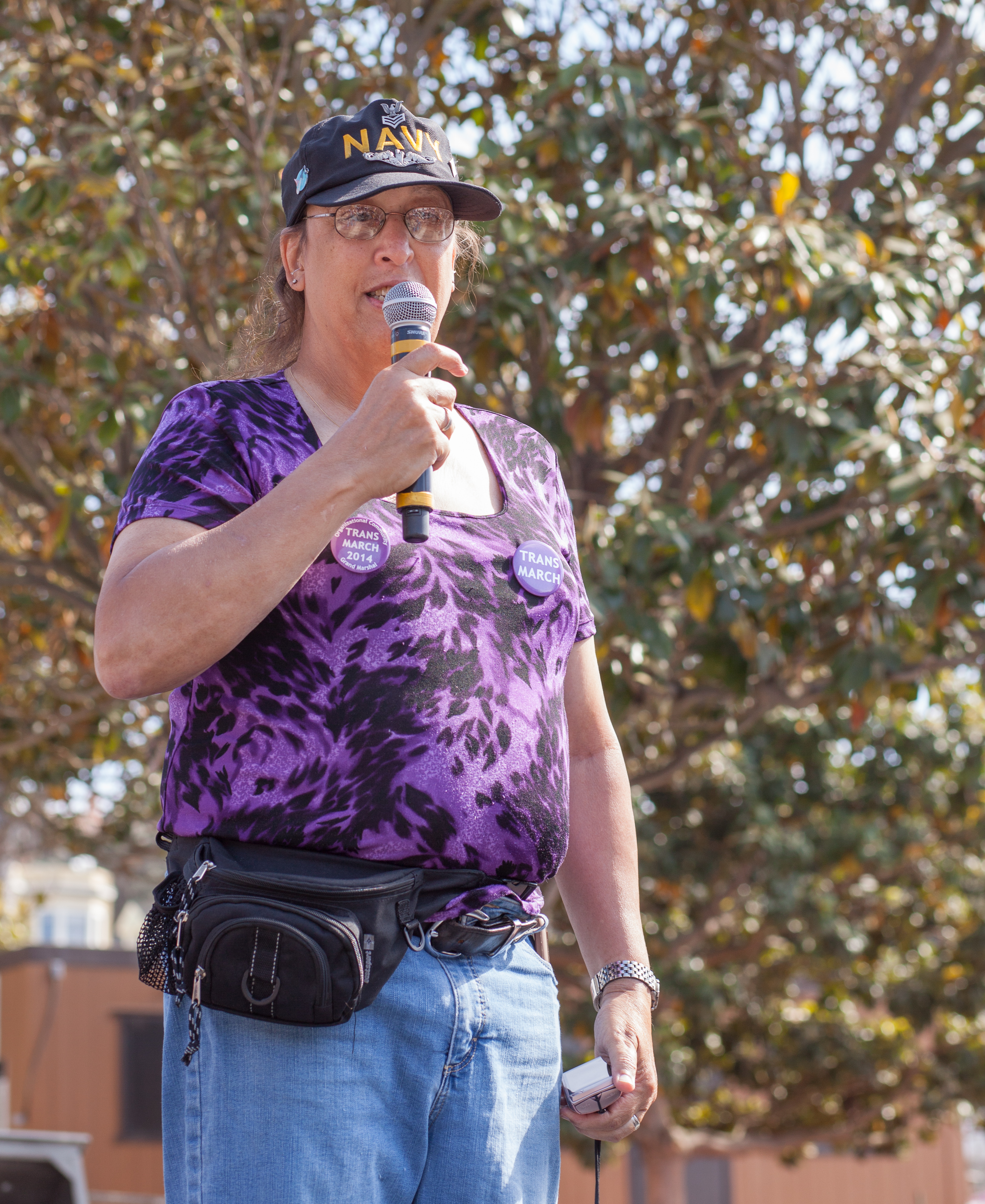
- Helms in 2015
- Born: March 8, 1951 (age 75); Sumter, South Carolina, U.S.
- Occupations: Writer; Speaker; Activist; Camera Operator; Editor
- Known for: Transgender activism; Transgender pride flag
- Political party: Democratic Party
- Spouse: Darlene Darlington Wagner

Monica F. Helms (born March 8, 1951) is an American transgender activist, author, and veteran of the United States Navy, who created the best-known transgender flag.

== Education ==
Helms received a General AA Degree and an AA in Industrial Television from Glendale Community College in Arizona in 1987 and graduated from Chattahoochee Technical College in 2018 with an AA Degree in Television Production Technology.

== US Navy career ==
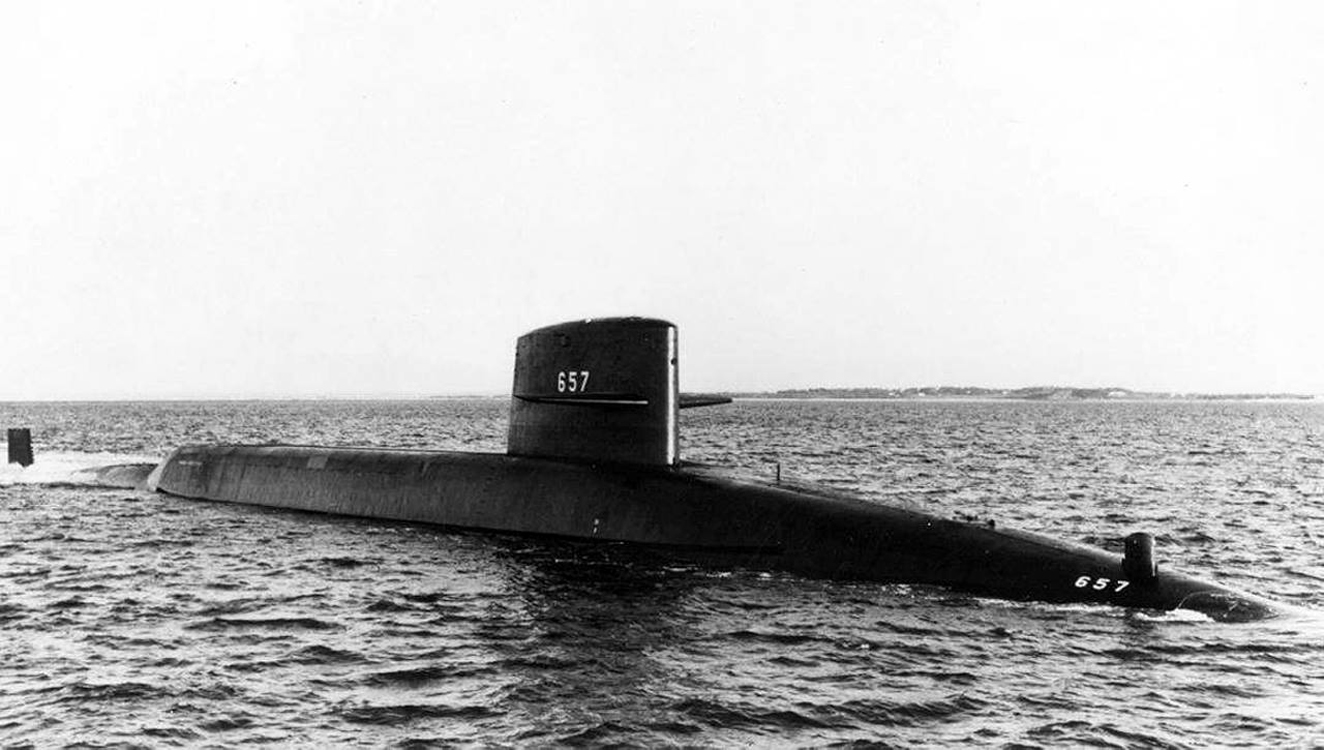
USS Francis Scott Key

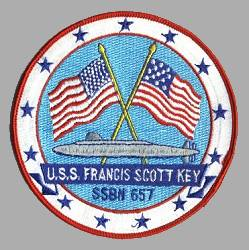
Key's Patch

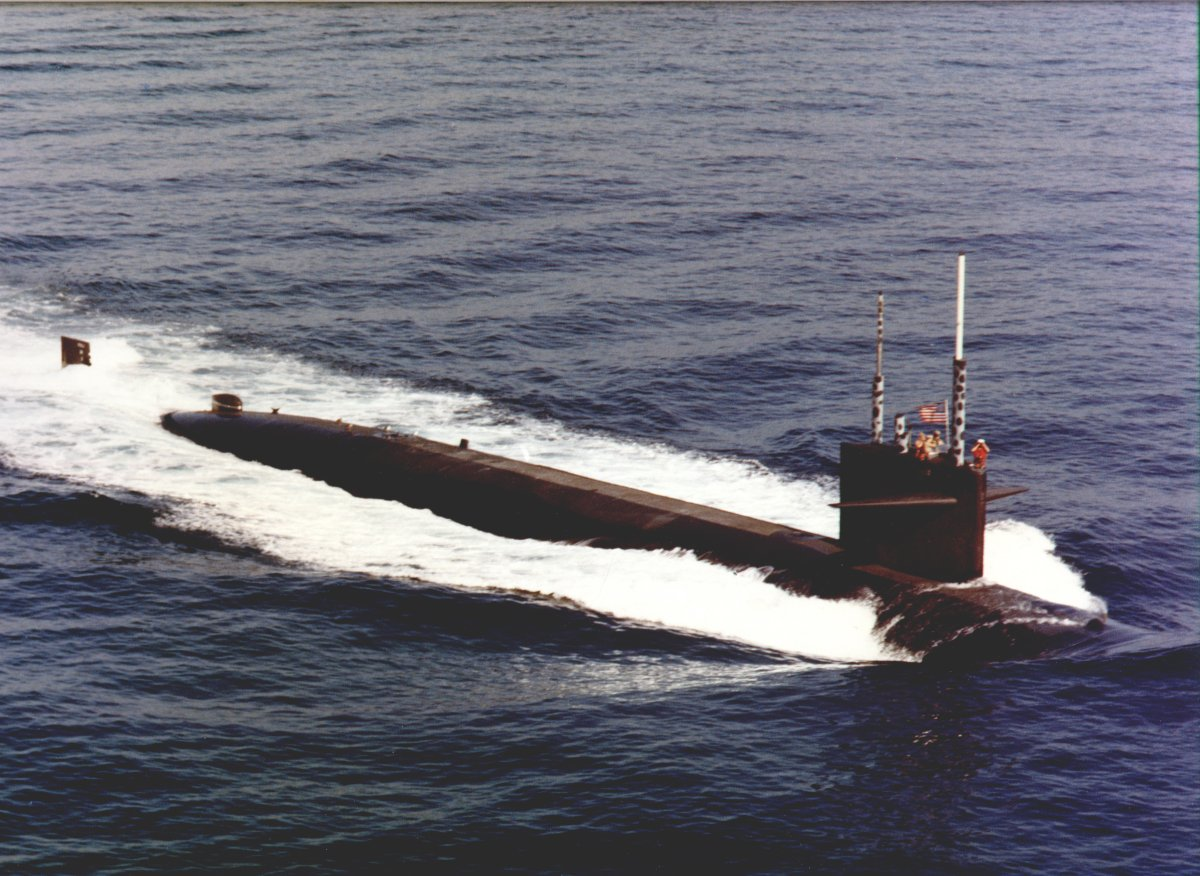
USS Flasher

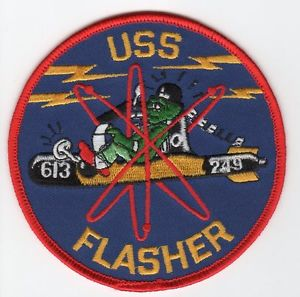
Flasher's Patch

Helms served in the U.S. Navy from 1970 to 1978, and was assigned to two submarines: USS Francis Scott Key (1972–1976) and USS Flasher (1976–1978). During her time in the Navy, Helms began dressing as a woman while based in Charleston, South Carolina and says in an interview it was the "deepest, darkest secret in [her] entire life". She was reassigned to the San Francisco area in 1976, and said she "felt like [she] could be out in public as [herself]".

Helms left the Navy in 1978, and joined her hometown's chapter of the United States Submarine Veterans, Inc. in 1996. After transitioning, Helms reapplied in 1998 to the Phoenix chapter of the veteran's group with the name "Monica" and received considerable push-back, including being referred to a more generic veteran's group for women rather than the submarine specific group. Helms eventually prevailed after a few months and is the first trans woman to ever join the organization.

== Activism ==
Transgender pride flag

Helms created a transgender pride flag in 1999, and it was first flown at a Pride Parade in Phoenix, Arizona in 2000.

Helms founded the Transgender American Veterans Association (TAVA) in 2003, and remained president until 2013. On May 1, 2004, TAVA sponsored the first ever Transgender Veterans March to the Wall. Fifty trans veterans arrived in DC and visited the Vietnam Memorial to honor people they knew whose names are on The Wall. They also made history when they became the first openly transgender people to lay a wreath at the Tomb of the Unknowns. They did it again in 2005. Even now, Helms continues to advocate for transgender service members and veterans. She was elected as a delegate to the 2004 Democratic National Convention in Boston, Massachusetts. She was the first openly trans person elected to a DNC Convention from Georgia.

Helms donated her original transgender pride flag to the Smithsonian National Museum of American History, at the first ceremony honoring the addition of a collection of LGBTQ historical items at the Smithsonian on August 19, 2014.

In June 2019, to mark the 50th anniversary of the Stonewall riots, an event widely considered a watershed moment in the modern LGBTQ rights movement, Queerty named her one of the Pride50 for "trailblazing individuals who actively ensure society remains moving towards equality, acceptance and dignity for all queer people".

== Book ==
In 2019, Helms released an autobiography titled More Than Just A Flag, detailing major events in her life from childhood, her career in the Navy and activism for the transgender community, published by MB Books.

== Personal life ==
Helms is married to Darlene Wagner. Wagner had worked for the Centers for Disease Control and Prevention (CDC) prior to being laid off by the Department of Government Efficiency (DOGE) in 2025.

In June 2025, Helms announced that she and Wagner plan to move to Costa Rica, as they are both trans women and fear that anti-trans laws will come to affect them in Georgia.
