= Cosmic latte =

Average color of the galaxies of the universe

Color coordinates
- Hex triplet: #FFF8E7
- sRGB^{B} (r, g, b): (255, 248, 231)
- HSV (h, s, v): (42°, 9%, 100%)
- CIELCh_{uv} (L, C, h): (98, 15, 70°)
- Source: Karl Glazebrook
- ISCC–NBS descriptor: Orangish white
- B: Normalized to [0–255] (byte)

Due to flawed calculations, the average color of the universe was originally thought to be turquoise.
- Cosmic spectrum green

Cosmic latte is the average color of the galaxies of the universe as perceived by a typical human observer from the position of the Earth. In 2002, astronomers Karl Glazebrook and Ivan Baldry from Johns Hopkins University determined that the average color of the universe was a whiteish green. Still, they soon corrected their analysis in a 2003 paper in which they reported that their survey of the light from over 200,000 galaxies averaged to a whiteish beige. The hex triplet value (assuming the standard sRGB color space) for the cosmic latte color is approximately #FFF8E7.

== Discovery of the color ==
Finding the average color of the universe was not the focus of the study. Rather, the study examined spectral analysis of different galaxies to study star formation. Similar to Fraunhofer lines, the dark lines displayed in the study's spectral ranges indicate older and younger stars and allow Glazebrook and Baldry to determine the age of different galaxies and star systems. What the study revealed is that the overwhelming majority of stars formed about 5 billion years ago. Because these stars would have been "brighter" in the past, the color of the universe changes over time, shifting from blue to red as more blue stars change to yellow and eventually red giants.

As light from distant galaxies reaches the Earth, the average "color of the universe" (as seen from Earth) tends towards pure white, due to the light coming from the stars when they were much younger and bluer.

=== Naming the color ===
The corrected color was initially published on the Johns Hopkins University (JHU) News website and updated on the team's initial announcement. Multiple news outlets, including NPR and BBC, displayed the color in stories and some relayed the request by Glazebrook on the announcement asking for suggestions for names, jokingly adding all were welcome as long as they were not "beige".

These were the results of a vote of the JHU astronomers involved based on the new color:

Color name	Credit	Votes
Cosmic Latte	Peter Drum	6
Cappuccino Cosmico	Peter Drum	17
Big Bang Buff/Blush/Beige	Several entrants	13
Cosmic Cream	Several entrants	8
Astronomer Green	Unknown	8
Astronomer Almond	Lisa Rose	7
Skyvory	Michael Howard	7
Univeige	Several entrants	6
Cosmic Khaki	Unknown	5
Primordial Clam Chowder	Unknown	4

Though Drum's suggestion of "cappuccino cosmico" received the most votes, the researchers favored Drum's other suggestion, "cosmic latte". "Latte" means "milk" in Italian, Galileo's native language, and the similar "latteo" means "milky", similar to the Italian term for the Milky Way, "Via Lattea". They enjoyed the fact that the color would be similar to the Milky Way's average color as well, as it is part of the sum of the universe. They also claimed to be "caffeine biased".

== See also ==
- Cosmic microwave background – Trace radiation from the early universe
- Electromagnetic spectrum – Full range of electromagnetic radiation frequencies
- Lists of colors
- Shades of white – Varieties of the color white
- Visible spectrum – Portion of the electromagnetic spectrum that is visible to the human eye
