= Non-binary flag =

Pride flag used by the non-binary community

- Adopted: 2014
- Design: Four equally-sized horizontal bars: yellow, white, purple, and black.
- Designed by: Kye Rowan
- Flag with a cosmic latte stripe as proposed by its creator
- Design: Four equally-sized horizontal bars: yellow, cosmic latte, purple, and black.

The non-binary flag is a pride flag that represents the non-binary community. It was designed by Kye Rowan in 2014.

The non-binary flag consists of four equally-sized horizontal bars: yellow, white, purple, and black. There is no official or agreed-upon proportion (the images in this article are 2:3).

The yellow stripe represents people outside the gender binary. The white stripe represents people with multiple genders. The purple stripe represents people who identify specifically as a blend of male and female. The black stripe represents agender people.

The design of both the genderqueer flag and the nonbinary flag include the colour lavender (purple) in reference to LGBTQ+ history. The word lavender had long been used to refer to the gay community. A 1935 dictionary of slang included the phrase "a streak of lavender" meaning a person who was regarded as effeminate. A different-gender marriage where both parties were assumed to be gay was called a lavender marriage. The Lavender Scare was a moral panic in the mid-20th century, where LGBT+ people were dismissed en masse from their jobs with the United States government. Expressions used by the LGBT+ community are sometimes referred to as lavender linguistics.

== History ==
Kye Rowan created the pride flag for non-binary people in February 2014 to represent people with genders beyond the artificial male/female binary. The flag was not intended to replace the genderqueer flag, which was created by Marilyn Roxie in 2011, but to be flown alongside it, and many believe it was intended to represent people who did not feel adequately represented by the genderqueer flag. The second stripe was initially plain white, but Rowan later proposed that it be the shade cosmic latte.

	Original design		Later design	
	Hex triplet	Color	Hex triplet	Color
Yellow	#FFF433		#FFF433	
White	#FFFFFF		#FFF8E7	
Purple	#9B59D0		#9B59D0	
Black	#2D2D2D		#2D2D2D	

During Eurovision 2024, the Swiss singer Nemo, who came in first place, sneaked a non-binary flag into the opening ceremony. Nemo later said "I had to sneak in the flag of my non-binary gender because Eurovision told me I couldn't take it out." Despite banning the non-binary flag, Eurovision's official Instagram account posted an image of the flag after the contest.

== Emoji ==
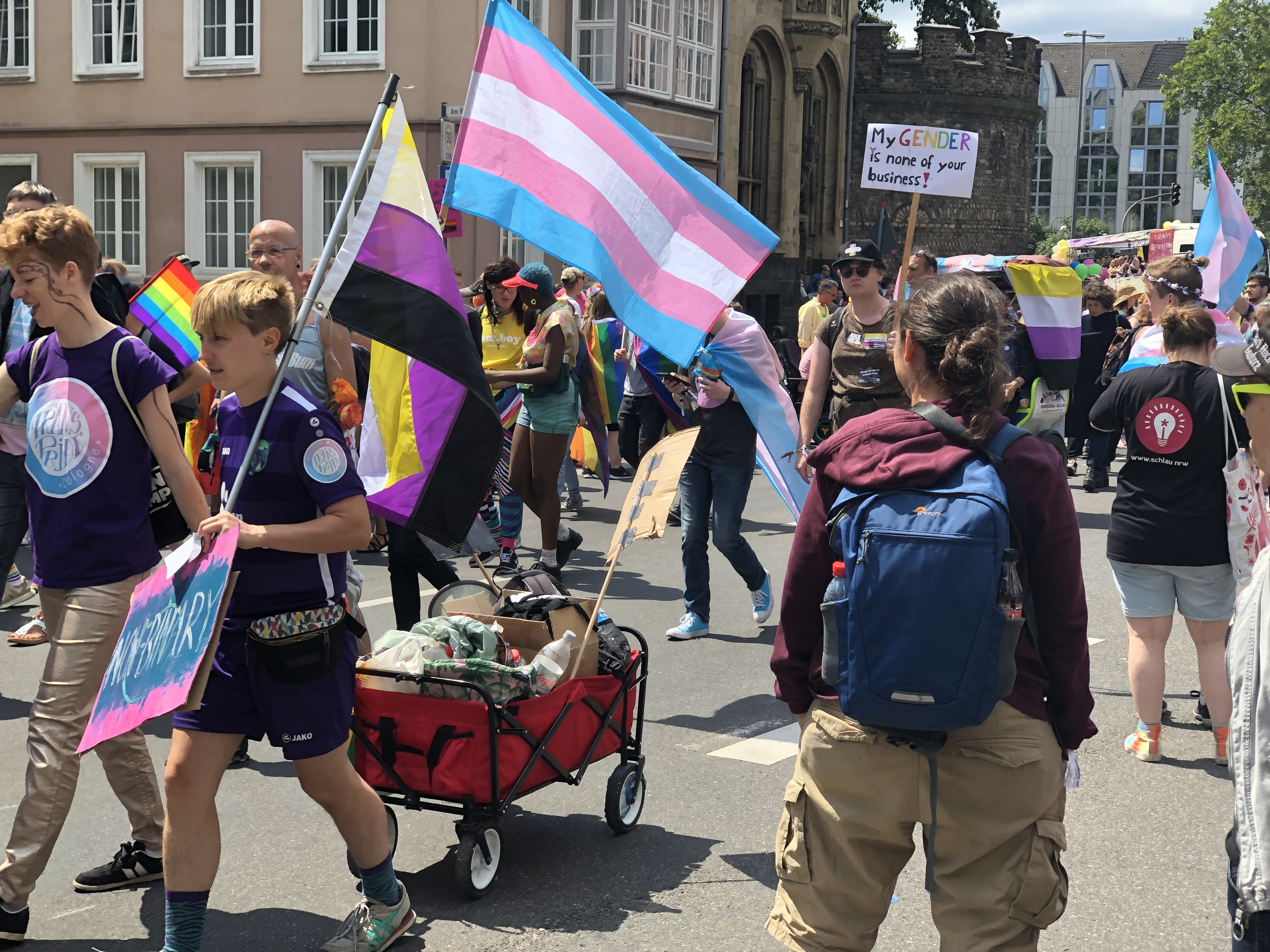
Non-binary flags at the Christopher Street Day parade in Cologne, 2019

Due to the Unicode Consortium having a blanket policy on not adding any additional flag emojis, an emoji for the non-binary flag will not be added unless the flag policy is rescinded or modified.

In the meantime, the non-binary flag can be represented with colored hearts: 💛🤍💜🖤, 🖤💜🤍💛

== See also ==
- LGBTQ symbols
- Discrimination against non-binary people
